

612001–612100 

|-bgcolor=#d6d6d6
| 612001 ||  || — || June 21, 2007 || Mount Lemmon || Mount Lemmon Survey ||  || align=right | 2.9 km || 
|-id=002 bgcolor=#E9E9E9
| 612002 ||  || — || June 22, 2007 || Kitt Peak || Spacewatch ||  || align=right | 1.1 km || 
|-id=003 bgcolor=#d6d6d6
| 612003 ||  || — || December 19, 2004 || Mount Lemmon || Mount Lemmon Survey ||  || align=right | 3.2 km || 
|-id=004 bgcolor=#E9E9E9
| 612004 ||  || — || June 23, 2007 || Kitt Peak || Spacewatch ||  || align=right | 1.5 km || 
|-id=005 bgcolor=#d6d6d6
| 612005 ||  || — || May 10, 2007 || Mount Lemmon || Mount Lemmon Survey ||  || align=right | 3.7 km || 
|-id=006 bgcolor=#d6d6d6
| 612006 ||  || — || April 7, 2006 || Mount Lemmon || Mount Lemmon Survey ||  || align=right | 3.2 km || 
|-id=007 bgcolor=#d6d6d6
| 612007 ||  || — || September 23, 2008 || Mount Lemmon || Mount Lemmon Survey ||  || align=right | 3.0 km || 
|-id=008 bgcolor=#E9E9E9
| 612008 ||  || — || June 23, 2007 || Siding Spring || SSS ||  || align=right | 1.2 km || 
|-id=009 bgcolor=#d6d6d6
| 612009 ||  || — || May 17, 2012 || Mount Lemmon || Mount Lemmon Survey ||  || align=right | 2.3 km || 
|-id=010 bgcolor=#d6d6d6
| 612010 ||  || — || February 3, 2017 || Mount Lemmon || Mount Lemmon Survey ||  || align=right | 2.5 km || 
|-id=011 bgcolor=#d6d6d6
| 612011 ||  || — || November 22, 2014 || Haleakala || Pan-STARRS ||  || align=right | 2.8 km || 
|-id=012 bgcolor=#FFC2E0
| 612012 ||  || — || June 13, 1983 || Palomar Mountain || E. F. Helin, R. S. Dunbar || APOPHA || align=right data-sort-value="0.46" | 460 m || 
|-id=013 bgcolor=#FFC2E0
| 612013 ||  || — || October 2, 1991 || Palomar Mountain || C. S. Shoemaker || APO || align=right data-sort-value="0.49" | 490 m || 
|-id=014 bgcolor=#E9E9E9
| 612014 ||  || — || November 4, 1991 || Kitt Peak || Spacewatch ||  || align=right | 2.1 km || 
|-id=015 bgcolor=#FA8072
| 612015 ||  || — || February 23, 1992 || Kitt Peak || Spacewatch ||  || align=right data-sort-value="0.58" | 580 m || 
|-id=016 bgcolor=#FA8072
| 612016 ||  || — || December 24, 1992 || Kitt Peak || Spacewatch ||  || align=right data-sort-value="0.46" | 460 m || 
|-id=017 bgcolor=#fefefe
| 612017 ||  || — || October 9, 1993 || Kitt Peak || Spacewatch ||  || align=right data-sort-value="0.66" | 660 m || 
|-id=018 bgcolor=#E9E9E9
| 612018 ||  || — || November 21, 1993 || Kitt Peak || Spacewatch ||  || align=right | 1.1 km || 
|-id=019 bgcolor=#C2E0FF
| 612019 ||  || — || March 13, 1994 || Mauna Kea || D. C. Jewitt, J. X. Luu || cubewano (cold)critical || align=right | 174 km || 
|-id=020 bgcolor=#FA8072
| 612020 ||  || — || September 12, 1994 || Kitt Peak || Spacewatch ||  || align=right data-sort-value="0.45" | 450 m || 
|-id=021 bgcolor=#E9E9E9
| 612021 ||  || — || September 29, 1994 || Kitt Peak || Spacewatch ||  || align=right | 1.9 km || 
|-id=022 bgcolor=#fefefe
| 612022 ||  || — || October 29, 1994 || Kitt Peak || Spacewatch ||  || align=right data-sort-value="0.55" | 550 m || 
|-id=023 bgcolor=#E9E9E9
| 612023 ||  || — || November 5, 1994 || Kitt Peak || Spacewatch || KON || align=right | 2.1 km || 
|-id=024 bgcolor=#E9E9E9
| 612024 ||  || — || November 26, 1994 || Kitt Peak || Spacewatch ||  || align=right | 1.1 km || 
|-id=025 bgcolor=#fefefe
| 612025 ||  || — || February 4, 1995 || Kitt Peak || Spacewatch ||  || align=right data-sort-value="0.57" | 570 m || 
|-id=026 bgcolor=#C2E0FF
| 612026 ||  || — || February 24, 1995 || Mauna Kea || J. X. Luu, D. C. Jewitt || cubewano (cold)critical || align=right | 159 km || 
|-id=027 bgcolor=#FFC2E0
| 612027 ||  || — || March 29, 1995 || La Silla || S. Mottola || APO || align=right data-sort-value="0.26" | 260 m || 
|-id=028 bgcolor=#d6d6d6
| 612028 ||  || — || March 27, 1995 || Kitt Peak || Spacewatch ||  || align=right | 2.4 km || 
|-id=029 bgcolor=#C2E0FF
| 612029 ||  || — || April 26, 1995 || Cerro Tololo || J. X. Luu || plutinocritical || align=right | 120 km || 
|-id=030 bgcolor=#fefefe
| 612030 ||  || — || September 17, 1995 || Kitt Peak || Spacewatch ||  || align=right data-sort-value="0.57" | 570 m || 
|-id=031 bgcolor=#E9E9E9
| 612031 ||  || — || September 18, 1995 || Kitt Peak || Spacewatch || DOR || align=right | 1.3 km || 
|-id=032 bgcolor=#d6d6d6
| 612032 ||  || — || September 26, 1995 || Kitt Peak || Spacewatch || SHU3:2 || align=right | 3.1 km || 
|-id=033 bgcolor=#fefefe
| 612033 ||  || — || September 26, 1995 || Kitt Peak || Spacewatch || MAS || align=right data-sort-value="0.46" | 460 m || 
|-id=034 bgcolor=#fefefe
| 612034 ||  || — || September 25, 1995 || Kitt Peak || Spacewatch || MAS || align=right data-sort-value="0.53" | 530 m || 
|-id=035 bgcolor=#E9E9E9
| 612035 ||  || — || September 18, 1995 || Kitt Peak || Spacewatch ||  || align=right data-sort-value="0.75" | 750 m || 
|-id=036 bgcolor=#E9E9E9
| 612036 ||  || — || September 21, 1995 || Kitt Peak || Spacewatch ||  || align=right data-sort-value="0.84" | 840 m || 
|-id=037 bgcolor=#d6d6d6
| 612037 ||  || — || September 19, 1995 || Kitt Peak || Spacewatch ||  || align=right | 1.8 km || 
|-id=038 bgcolor=#fefefe
| 612038 ||  || — || September 27, 1995 || Kitt Peak || Spacewatch ||  || align=right data-sort-value="0.56" | 560 m || 
|-id=039 bgcolor=#E9E9E9
| 612039 ||  || — || October 15, 1995 || Kitt Peak || Spacewatch ||  || align=right data-sort-value="0.71" | 710 m || 
|-id=040 bgcolor=#E9E9E9
| 612040 ||  || — || October 20, 1995 || Kitt Peak || Spacewatch || (1547) || align=right data-sort-value="0.97" | 970 m || 
|-id=041 bgcolor=#E9E9E9
| 612041 ||  || — || October 20, 1995 || Kitt Peak || Spacewatch ||  || align=right data-sort-value="0.76" | 760 m || 
|-id=042 bgcolor=#fefefe
| 612042 ||  || — || April 11, 1996 || Kitt Peak || Spacewatch ||  || align=right data-sort-value="0.55" | 550 m || 
|-id=043 bgcolor=#E9E9E9
| 612043 ||  || — || September 5, 1996 || Kitt Peak || Spacewatch ||  || align=right data-sort-value="0.67" | 670 m || 
|-id=044 bgcolor=#E9E9E9
| 612044 ||  || — || September 13, 1996 || Kitt Peak || Spacewatch ||  || align=right | 1.4 km || 
|-id=045 bgcolor=#C2E0FF
| 612045 ||  || — || September 15, 1996 || La Palma || La Palma Obs. || plutinocritical || align=right | 188 km || 
|-id=046 bgcolor=#E9E9E9
| 612046 ||  || — || October 9, 1996 || Haleakala-NEAT/GEO || NEAT ||  || align=right | 1.7 km || 
|-id=047 bgcolor=#C2E0FF
| 612047 ||  || — || October 9, 1996 || Cerro Tololo || B. Schmidt || cubewano (cold)critical || align=right | 236 km || 
|-id=048 bgcolor=#C2E0FF
| 612048 ||  || — || October 12, 1996 || Mauna Kea || Mauna Kea Obs. || cubewano (hot) || align=right | 257 km || 
|-id=049 bgcolor=#C2E0FF
| 612049 ||  || — || February 2, 1997 || Mauna Kea || Mauna Kea Obs. || cubewano (cold)critical || align=right | 216 km || 
|-id=050 bgcolor=#FFC2E0
| 612050 ||  || — || April 7, 1997 || Socorro || LINEAR || APOPHA || align=right data-sort-value="0.53" | 530 m || 
|-id=051 bgcolor=#C2E0FF
| 612051 ||  || — || September 24, 1997 || Mauna Kea || D. C. Jewitt || twotinocritical || align=right | 86 km || 
|-id=052 bgcolor=#E9E9E9
| 612052 ||  || — || September 27, 1997 || Kitt Peak || Spacewatch ||  || align=right | 1.0 km || 
|-id=053 bgcolor=#E9E9E9
| 612053 ||  || — || September 29, 1997 || Kitt Peak || Spacewatch ||  || align=right data-sort-value="0.78" | 780 m || 
|-id=054 bgcolor=#d6d6d6
| 612054 ||  || — || October 1, 1997 || Mauna Kea || C. Veillet, R. Shank ||  || align=right | 2.2 km || 
|-id=055 bgcolor=#fefefe
| 612055 ||  || — || October 24, 1997 || Peking || SCAP ||  || align=right data-sort-value="0.87" | 870 m || 
|-id=056 bgcolor=#FA8072
| 612056 ||  || — || March 2, 1998 || Kitt Peak || Spacewatch || H || align=right data-sort-value="0.53" | 530 m || 
|-id=057 bgcolor=#FFC2E0
| 612057 ||  || — || March 31, 1998 || Socorro || LINEAR || AMO || align=right data-sort-value="0.56" | 560 m || 
|-id=058 bgcolor=#FFC2E0
| 612058 ||  || — || April 19, 1998 || Kitt Peak || Spacewatch || AMO || align=right data-sort-value="0.77" | 770 m || 
|-id=059 bgcolor=#E9E9E9
| 612059 ||  || — || April 21, 1998 || Klet || Kleť Obs. ||  || align=right data-sort-value="0.98" | 980 m || 
|-id=060 bgcolor=#C2E0FF
| 612060 ||  || — || April 28, 1998 || Mauna Kea || Mauna Kea Obs. || plutinocritical || align=right | 95 km || 
|-id=061 bgcolor=#FFC2E0
| 612061 ||  || — || June 30, 1998 || Socorro || LINEAR || AMO || align=right data-sort-value="0.49" | 490 m || 
|-id=062 bgcolor=#FA8072
| 612062 ||  || — || July 26, 1998 || Anderson Mesa || LONEOS ||  || align=right | 1.2 km || 
|-id=063 bgcolor=#d6d6d6
| 612063 ||  || — || August 19, 1998 || Socorro || LINEAR ||  || align=right | 2.0 km || 
|-id=064 bgcolor=#FFC2E0
| 612064 ||  || — || August 27, 1998 || Socorro || LINEAR || AMOcritical || align=right data-sort-value="0.21" | 210 m || 
|-id=065 bgcolor=#FA8072
| 612065 ||  || — || August 31, 1998 || Socorro || LINEAR ||  || align=right data-sort-value="0.98" | 980 m || 
|-id=066 bgcolor=#FA8072
| 612066 ||  || — || September 14, 1998 || Socorro || LINEAR ||  || align=right | 1.3 km || 
|-id=067 bgcolor=#fefefe
| 612067 ||  || — || September 13, 1998 || Kitt Peak || Spacewatch || MAS || align=right data-sort-value="0.48" | 480 m || 
|-id=068 bgcolor=#E9E9E9
| 612068 ||  || — || September 14, 1998 || Socorro || LINEAR ||  || align=right data-sort-value="0.96" | 960 m || 
|-id=069 bgcolor=#E9E9E9
| 612069 ||  || — || September 20, 1998 || Kitt Peak || Spacewatch ||  || align=right data-sort-value="0.74" | 740 m || 
|-id=070 bgcolor=#d6d6d6
| 612070 ||  || — || September 23, 1998 || Catalina || CSS ||  || align=right | 2.4 km || 
|-id=071 bgcolor=#d6d6d6
| 612071 ||  || — || September 18, 1998 || Kitt Peak || Spacewatch ||  || align=right | 2.1 km || 
|-id=072 bgcolor=#E9E9E9
| 612072 ||  || — || September 20, 1998 || Kitt Peak || Spacewatch ||  || align=right data-sort-value="0.72" | 720 m || 
|-id=073 bgcolor=#d6d6d6
| 612073 ||  || — || September 25, 1998 || Kitt Peak || Spacewatch || EOS || align=right | 2.1 km || 
|-id=074 bgcolor=#fefefe
| 612074 ||  || — || September 25, 1998 || Kitt Peak || Spacewatch ||  || align=right data-sort-value="0.51" | 510 m || 
|-id=075 bgcolor=#d6d6d6
| 612075 ||  || — || September 27, 1998 || Kitt Peak || Spacewatch ||  || align=right | 1.6 km || 
|-id=076 bgcolor=#E9E9E9
| 612076 ||  || — || September 26, 1998 || Socorro || LINEAR ||  || align=right | 1.1 km || 
|-id=077 bgcolor=#d6d6d6
| 612077 ||  || — || September 26, 1998 || Socorro || LINEAR ||  || align=right | 1.9 km || 
|-id=078 bgcolor=#B88A00
| 612078 ||  || — || October 19, 1998 || Socorro || LINEAR || Tj (2.2) || align=right | 1.9 km || 
|-id=079 bgcolor=#E9E9E9
| 612079 ||  || — || October 17, 1998 || Kitt Peak || Spacewatch ||  || align=right data-sort-value="0.52" | 520 m || 
|-id=080 bgcolor=#E9E9E9
| 612080 ||  || — || November 15, 1998 || Kitt Peak || Spacewatch ||  || align=right data-sort-value="0.92" | 920 m || 
|-id=081 bgcolor=#C2E0FF
| 612081 ||  || — || November 18, 1998 || Kitt Peak || M. W. Buie || cubewano (cold)critical || align=right | 198 km || 
|-id=082 bgcolor=#C2E0FF
| 612082 ||  || — || November 18, 1998 || Kitt Peak || M. W. Buie || cubewano (cold)critical || align=right | 192 km || 
|-id=083 bgcolor=#C2E0FF
| 612083 ||  || — || November 18, 1998 || Kitt Peak || M. W. Buie || cubewano (cold)critical || align=right | 199 km || 
|-id=084 bgcolor=#C2E0FF
| 612084 ||  || — || February 11, 1999 || Mauna Kea || Mauna Kea Obs. || SDOcritical || align=right | 165 km || 
|-id=085 bgcolor=#C2E0FF
| 612085 ||  || — || February 11, 1999 || Mauna Kea || Mauna Kea Obs. || other TNOcritical || align=right | 265 km || 
|-id=086 bgcolor=#C2E0FF
| 612086 ||  || — || February 11, 1999 || Mauna Kea || Mauna Kea Obs. || res3:5critical || align=right | 168 km || 
|-id=087 bgcolor=#C2E0FF
| 612087 ||  || — || February 12, 1999 || Mauna Kea || Mauna Kea Obs. || cubewano (cold)critical || align=right | 160 km || 
|-id=088 bgcolor=#C2E0FF
| 612088 ||  || — || February 11, 1999 || Mauna Kea || Mauna Kea Obs. || plutinomooncritical || align=right | 121 km || 
|-id=089 bgcolor=#FFC2E0
| 612089 ||  || — || March 22, 1999 || Kitt Peak || Kitt Peak Obs. || APO || align=right data-sort-value="0.32" | 320 m || 
|-id=090 bgcolor=#fefefe
| 612090 ||  || — || March 20, 1999 || Apache Point || Apache Point Obs. ||  || align=right data-sort-value="0.56" | 560 m || 
|-id=091 bgcolor=#FFC2E0
| 612091 ||  || — || April 18, 1999 || Kitt Peak || Kitt Peak Obs. || AMO +1km || align=right | 1.1 km || 
|-id=092 bgcolor=#C2E0FF
| 612092 ||  || — || April 18, 1999 || Kitt Peak || Kitt Peak Obs. || cubewano (cold)critical || align=right | 133 km || 
|-id=093 bgcolor=#C7FF8F
| 612093 ||  || — || June 12, 1999 || Socorro || Lincoln Lab ETS || damocloid || align=right | 13 km || 
|-id=094 bgcolor=#FFC2E0
| 612094 ||  || — || July 13, 1999 || Socorro || Lincoln Lab ETS || APO || align=right data-sort-value="0.079" | 79 m || 
|-id=095 bgcolor=#C2E0FF
| 612095 ||  || — || July 18, 1999 || Mauna Kea || Mauna Kea Obs. || other TNOmooncritical || align=right | 172 km || 
|-id=096 bgcolor=#FA8072
| 612096 ||  || — || September 8, 1999 || Socorro || Lincoln Lab ETS ||  || align=right | 2.1 km || 
|-id=097 bgcolor=#FA8072
| 612097 ||  || — || September 8, 1999 || Socorro || Lincoln Lab ETS ||  || align=right | 1.2 km || 
|-id=098 bgcolor=#FFC2E0
| 612098 ||  || — || September 14, 1999 || Socorro || Lincoln Lab ETS || APOPHAmoon || align=right data-sort-value="0.40" | 400 m || 
|-id=099 bgcolor=#fefefe
| 612099 ||  || — || September 14, 1999 || Kitt Peak || Kitt Peak Obs. ||  || align=right data-sort-value="0.57" | 570 m || 
|-id=100 bgcolor=#C2E0FF
| 612100 ||  || — || September 6, 1999 || Mauna Kea || Mauna Kea Obs. || cubewano (cold)critical || align=right | 187 km || 
|}

612101–612200 

|-bgcolor=#C2E0FF
| 612101 ||  || — || September 7, 1999 || Mauna Kea || Mauna Kea Obs. || SDOcritical || align=right | 147 km || 
|-id=102 bgcolor=#C2E0FF
| 612102 ||  || — || September 7, 1999 || Mauna Kea || Mauna Kea Obs. || plutinocritical || align=right | 141 km || 
|-id=103 bgcolor=#FFC2E0
| 612103 ||  || — || September 30, 1999 || Kitt Peak || Kitt Peak Obs. || APO || align=right data-sort-value="0.38" | 380 m || 
|-id=104 bgcolor=#E9E9E9
| 612104 ||  || — || September 16, 1999 || Kitt Peak || Kitt Peak Obs. ||  || align=right | 1.8 km || 
|-id=105 bgcolor=#d6d6d6
| 612105 ||  || — || October 4, 1999 || Kitt Peak || Kitt Peak Obs. ||  || align=right | 1.9 km || 
|-id=106 bgcolor=#d6d6d6
| 612106 ||  || — || October 4, 1999 || Kitt Peak || Kitt Peak Obs. ||  || align=right | 2.0 km || 
|-id=107 bgcolor=#fefefe
| 612107 ||  || — || October 6, 1999 || Kitt Peak || Kitt Peak Obs. ||  || align=right data-sort-value="0.64" | 640 m || 
|-id=108 bgcolor=#E9E9E9
| 612108 ||  || — || October 6, 1999 || Kitt Peak || Kitt Peak Obs. ||  || align=right data-sort-value="0.45" | 450 m || 
|-id=109 bgcolor=#fefefe
| 612109 ||  || — || October 7, 1999 || Kitt Peak || Kitt Peak Obs. ||  || align=right data-sort-value="0.41" | 410 m || 
|-id=110 bgcolor=#fefefe
| 612110 ||  || — || October 7, 1999 || Kitt Peak || Kitt Peak Obs. ||  || align=right data-sort-value="0.49" | 490 m || 
|-id=111 bgcolor=#fefefe
| 612111 ||  || — || October 8, 1999 || Kitt Peak || Kitt Peak Obs. ||  || align=right data-sort-value="0.66" | 660 m || 
|-id=112 bgcolor=#fefefe
| 612112 ||  || — || October 12, 1999 || Kitt Peak || Kitt Peak Obs. ||  || align=right data-sort-value="0.57" | 570 m || 
|-id=113 bgcolor=#E9E9E9
| 612113 ||  || — || October 7, 1999 || Socorro || Lincoln Lab ETS ||  || align=right data-sort-value="0.97" | 970 m || 
|-id=114 bgcolor=#fefefe
| 612114 ||  || — || October 13, 1999 || Socorro || Lincoln Lab ETS ||  || align=right data-sort-value="0.90" | 900 m || 
|-id=115 bgcolor=#E9E9E9
| 612115 ||  || — || October 9, 1999 || Kitt Peak || Kitt Peak Obs. ||  || align=right data-sort-value="0.81" | 810 m || 
|-id=116 bgcolor=#E9E9E9
| 612116 ||  || — || October 7, 1999 || Kitt Peak || Kitt Peak Obs. ||  || align=right | 1.5 km || 
|-id=117 bgcolor=#fefefe
| 612117 ||  || — || October 11, 1999 || Kitt Peak || Kitt Peak Obs. ||  || align=right data-sort-value="0.35" | 350 m || 
|-id=118 bgcolor=#FA8072
| 612118 ||  || — || October 29, 1999 || Socorro || Lincoln Lab ETS ||  || align=right | 1.6 km || 
|-id=119 bgcolor=#d6d6d6
| 612119 ||  || — || October 31, 1999 || Kitt Peak || Kitt Peak Obs. ||  || align=right | 1.5 km || 
|-id=120 bgcolor=#fefefe
| 612120 ||  || — || October 31, 1999 || Kitt Peak || Kitt Peak Obs. ||  || align=right data-sort-value="0.45" | 450 m || 
|-id=121 bgcolor=#E9E9E9
| 612121 ||  || — || November 1, 1999 || Kitt Peak || Kitt Peak Obs. ||  || align=right data-sort-value="0.67" | 670 m || 
|-id=122 bgcolor=#FA8072
| 612122 ||  || — || November 4, 1999 || Catalina || CSS ||  || align=right data-sort-value="0.45" | 450 m || 
|-id=123 bgcolor=#fefefe
| 612123 ||  || — || November 2, 1999 || Kitt Peak || Kitt Peak Obs. ||  || align=right data-sort-value="0.66" | 660 m || 
|-id=124 bgcolor=#fefefe
| 612124 ||  || — || November 11, 1999 || Kitt Peak || Kitt Peak Obs. ||  || align=right data-sort-value="0.93" | 930 m || 
|-id=125 bgcolor=#E9E9E9
| 612125 ||  || — || November 4, 1999 || Kitt Peak || Kitt Peak Obs. ||  || align=right | 1.1 km || 
|-id=126 bgcolor=#fefefe
| 612126 ||  || — || November 12, 1999 || Socorro || Lincoln Lab ETS ||  || align=right | 1.1 km || 
|-id=127 bgcolor=#d6d6d6
| 612127 ||  || — || November 5, 1999 || Kitt Peak || Kitt Peak Obs. ||  || align=right | 2.6 km || 
|-id=128 bgcolor=#FA8072
| 612128 ||  || — || November 1, 1999 || Catalina || CSS ||  || align=right data-sort-value="0.88" | 880 m || 
|-id=129 bgcolor=#FA8072
| 612129 ||  || — || November 7, 1999 || Socorro || Lincoln Lab ETS ||  || align=right data-sort-value="0.80" | 800 m || 
|-id=130 bgcolor=#d6d6d6
| 612130 ||  || — || November 9, 1999 || Socorro || Lincoln Lab ETS ||  || align=right | 2.8 km || 
|-id=131 bgcolor=#d6d6d6
| 612131 ||  || — || November 4, 1999 || Kitt Peak || Kitt Peak Obs. ||  || align=right | 2.2 km || 
|-id=132 bgcolor=#E9E9E9
| 612132 ||  || — || November 5, 1999 || Kitt Peak || Kitt Peak Obs. ||  || align=right data-sort-value="0.94" | 940 m || 
|-id=133 bgcolor=#d6d6d6
| 612133 ||  || — || November 9, 1999 || Kitt Peak || Kitt Peak Obs. ||  || align=right | 1.4 km || 
|-id=134 bgcolor=#E9E9E9
| 612134 ||  || — || November 13, 1999 || Socorro || Lincoln Lab ETS ||  || align=right | 1.3 km || 
|-id=135 bgcolor=#E9E9E9
| 612135 ||  || — || November 1, 1999 || Kitt Peak || Kitt Peak Obs. ||  || align=right data-sort-value="0.45" | 450 m || 
|-id=136 bgcolor=#E9E9E9
| 612136 ||  || — || November 28, 1999 || Kitt Peak || Kitt Peak Obs. ||  || align=right | 1.0 km || 
|-id=137 bgcolor=#E9E9E9
| 612137 ||  || — || November 30, 1999 || Kitt Peak || Kitt Peak Obs. ||  || align=right data-sort-value="0.79" | 790 m || 
|-id=138 bgcolor=#fefefe
| 612138 ||  || — || November 28, 1999 || Kitt Peak || Kitt Peak Obs. ||  || align=right data-sort-value="0.52" | 520 m || 
|-id=139 bgcolor=#FA8072
| 612139 ||  || — || December 10, 1999 || Socorro || Lincoln Lab ETS || Tj (2.85) || align=right | 1.7 km || 
|-id=140 bgcolor=#FA8072
| 612140 ||  || — || December 13, 1999 || Socorro || Lincoln Lab ETS ||  || align=right data-sort-value="0.83" | 830 m || 
|-id=141 bgcolor=#C2E0FF
| 612141 ||  || — || December 14, 1999 || Whipple || Whipple Obs. || cubewano (hot)mooncritical || align=right | 256 km || 
|-id=142 bgcolor=#d6d6d6
| 612142 ||  || — || January 5, 2000 || Kitt Peak || Spacewatch ||  || align=right | 3.7 km || 
|-id=143 bgcolor=#FFC2E0
| 612143 ||  || — || January 30, 2000 || Kitt Peak || Spacewatch || APOPHA || align=right data-sort-value="0.38" | 380 m || 
|-id=144 bgcolor=#C2E0FF
| 612144 ||  || — || February 6, 2000 || Kitt Peak || M. W. Buie || cubewano (hot)critical || align=right | 198 km || 
|-id=145 bgcolor=#C2E0FF
| 612145 ||  || — || February 6, 2000 || Kitt Peak || M. W. Buie || res3:4critical || align=right | 113 km || 
|-id=146 bgcolor=#C2E0FF
| 612146 ||  || — || February 5, 2000 || Kitt Peak || M. W. Buie || cubewano (cold)critical || align=right | 156 km || 
|-id=147 bgcolor=#C2E0FF
| 612147 ||  || — || February 5, 2000 || Kitt Peak || M. W. Buie || cubewano (cold)mooncritical || align=right | 168 km || 
|-id=148 bgcolor=#C2E0FF
| 612148 ||  || — || February 5, 2000 || Kitt Peak || M. W. Buie || other TNOcritical || align=right | 209 km || 
|-id=149 bgcolor=#C2E0FF
| 612149 ||  || — || February 5, 2000 || Kitt Peak || M. W. Buie || cubewano (hot) || align=right | 269 km || 
|-id=150 bgcolor=#C2E0FF
| 612150 ||  || — || February 5, 2000 || Kitt Peak || M. W. Buie || other TNOcritical || align=right | 304 km || 
|-id=151 bgcolor=#fefefe
| 612151 ||  || — || February 6, 2000 || Kitt Peak || M. W. Buie ||  || align=right data-sort-value="0.60" | 600 m || 
|-id=152 bgcolor=#FFC2E0
| 612152 ||  || — || February 28, 2000 || Socorro || LINEAR || AMO || align=right data-sort-value="0.51" | 510 m || 
|-id=153 bgcolor=#E9E9E9
| 612153 ||  || — || March 3, 2000 || Kitt Peak || Spacewatch ||  || align=right | 1.6 km || 
|-id=154 bgcolor=#FA8072
| 612154 ||  || — || March 9, 2000 || Kitt Peak || Spacewatch ||  || align=right data-sort-value="0.48" | 480 m || 
|-id=155 bgcolor=#fefefe
| 612155 ||  || — || March 25, 2000 || Kitt Peak || Spacewatch ||  || align=right data-sort-value="0.50" | 500 m || 
|-id=156 bgcolor=#C2E0FF
| 612156 ||  || — || March 29, 2000 || Mauna Kea || Mauna Kea Obs. || cubewano (cold)critical || align=right | 129 km || 
|-id=157 bgcolor=#C2E0FF
| 612157 ||  || — || March 29, 2000 || Mauna Kea || Mauna Kea Obs. || cubewano (cold)critical || align=right | 133 km || 
|-id=158 bgcolor=#C2E0FF
| 612158 ||  || — || March 31, 2000 || Mauna Kea || Mauna Kea Obs. || plutinocritical || align=right | 108 km || 
|-id=159 bgcolor=#FA8072
| 612159 ||  || — || April 25, 2000 || Anderson Mesa || LONEOS ||  || align=right data-sort-value="0.51" | 510 m || 
|-id=160 bgcolor=#E9E9E9
| 612160 ||  || — || May 2, 2000 || Socorro || LINEAR ||  || align=right | 1.3 km || 
|-id=161 bgcolor=#C2E0FF
| 612161 ||  || — || May 26, 2000 || Kitt Peak || Kitt Peak Obs. || other TNOcritical || align=right | 249 km || 
|-id=162 bgcolor=#FFC2E0
| 612162 ||  || — || June 1, 2000 || Anderson Mesa || LONEOS || APO || align=right data-sort-value="0.73" | 730 m || 
|-id=163 bgcolor=#fefefe
| 612163 Thelowes ||  ||  || June 3, 2000 || Mauna Kea || P. B. Stetson, D. D. Balam ||  || align=right data-sort-value="0.89" | 890 m || 
|-id=164 bgcolor=#E9E9E9
| 612164 ||  || — || June 7, 2000 || Kitt Peak || Spacewatch ||  || align=right data-sort-value="0.95" | 950 m || 
|-id=165 bgcolor=#FA8072
| 612165 ||  || — || July 29, 2000 || Anderson Mesa || LONEOS ||  || align=right | 1.1 km || 
|-id=166 bgcolor=#C2E0FF
| 612166 ||  || — || July 31, 2000 || Cerro Tololo || M. W. Buie, S. D. Kern || cubewano (cold)critical || align=right | 194 km || 
|-id=167 bgcolor=#C2E0FF
| 612167 ||  || — || July 29, 2000 || Cerro Tololo || M. W. Buie || cubewano (cold)critical || align=right | 194 km || 
|-id=168 bgcolor=#FA8072
| 612168 ||  || — || August 1, 2000 || Socorro || LINEAR ||  || align=right data-sort-value="0.83" | 830 m || 
|-id=169 bgcolor=#fefefe
| 612169 ||  || — || August 3, 2000 || Socorro || LINEAR ||  || align=right | 1.1 km || 
|-id=170 bgcolor=#FA8072
| 612170 ||  || — || August 2, 2000 || Socorro || LINEAR ||  || align=right | 1.7 km || 
|-id=171 bgcolor=#FFC2E0
| 612171 ||  || — || August 24, 2000 || Socorro || LINEAR || AMO || align=right data-sort-value="0.31" | 310 m || 
|-id=172 bgcolor=#FA8072
| 612172 ||  || — || August 24, 2000 || Socorro || LINEAR ||  || align=right data-sort-value="0.61" | 610 m || 
|-id=173 bgcolor=#FA8072
| 612173 ||  || — || August 31, 2000 || Socorro || LINEAR ||  || align=right | 1.5 km || 
|-id=174 bgcolor=#C2E0FF
| 612174 ||  || — || August 29, 2000 || La Silla || O. R. Hainaut, C. E. Delahodde || cubewano (cold)critical || align=right | 189 km || 
|-id=175 bgcolor=#C2E0FF
| 612175 ||  || — || August 29, 2000 || La Silla || O. R. Hainaut, C. E. Delahodde || cubewano (cold)critical || align=right | 228 km || 
|-id=176 bgcolor=#C2E0FF
| 612176 ||  || — || August 25, 2000 || Cerro Tololo || M. W. Buie || twotinomooncritical || align=right | 209 km || 
|-id=177 bgcolor=#fefefe
| 612177 ||  || — || September 1, 2000 || Socorro || LINEAR ||  || align=right data-sort-value="0.77" | 770 m || 
|-id=178 bgcolor=#E9E9E9
| 612178 ||  || — || September 4, 2000 || Haleakala || NEAT ||  || align=right data-sort-value="0.92" | 920 m || 
|-id=179 bgcolor=#fefefe
| 612179 ||  || — || September 22, 2000 || Prescott || P. G. Comba ||  || align=right data-sort-value="0.77" | 770 m || 
|-id=180 bgcolor=#E9E9E9
| 612180 ||  || — || September 23, 2000 || Socorro || LINEAR ||  || align=right data-sort-value="0.74" | 740 m || 
|-id=181 bgcolor=#FA8072
| 612181 ||  || — || September 24, 2000 || Socorro || LINEAR ||  || align=right data-sort-value="0.58" | 580 m || 
|-id=182 bgcolor=#E9E9E9
| 612182 ||  || — || September 24, 2000 || Socorro || LINEAR ||  || align=right data-sort-value="0.97" | 970 m || 
|-id=183 bgcolor=#d6d6d6
| 612183 ||  || — || September 20, 2000 || Haleakala || NEAT ||  || align=right | 2.2 km || 
|-id=184 bgcolor=#E9E9E9
| 612184 ||  || — || September 24, 2000 || Socorro || LINEAR ||  || align=right data-sort-value="0.89" | 890 m || 
|-id=185 bgcolor=#E9E9E9
| 612185 ||  || — || September 28, 2000 || Socorro || LINEAR ||  || align=right | 1.2 km || 
|-id=186 bgcolor=#FA8072
| 612186 ||  || — || September 28, 2000 || Socorro || LINEAR ||  || align=right data-sort-value="0.71" | 710 m || 
|-id=187 bgcolor=#fefefe
| 612187 ||  || — || September 30, 2000 || Socorro || LINEAR ||  || align=right data-sort-value="0.77" | 770 m || 
|-id=188 bgcolor=#E9E9E9
| 612188 ||  || — || September 23, 2000 || Anderson Mesa || LONEOS ||  || align=right data-sort-value="0.78" | 780 m || 
|-id=189 bgcolor=#fefefe
| 612189 ||  || — || October 1, 2000 || Socorro || LINEAR ||  || align=right data-sort-value="0.64" | 640 m || 
|-id=190 bgcolor=#FA8072
| 612190 ||  || — || October 1, 2000 || Socorro || LINEAR ||  || align=right data-sort-value="0.55" | 550 m || 
|-id=191 bgcolor=#E9E9E9
| 612191 ||  || — || October 1, 2000 || Socorro || LINEAR ||  || align=right | 1.8 km || 
|-id=192 bgcolor=#FA8072
| 612192 ||  || — || October 4, 2000 || Socorro || LINEAR ||  || align=right data-sort-value="0.94" | 940 m || 
|-id=193 bgcolor=#FA8072
| 612193 ||  || — || October 1, 2000 || Socorro || LINEAR ||  || align=right data-sort-value="0.68" | 680 m || 
|-id=194 bgcolor=#E9E9E9
| 612194 ||  || — || October 24, 2000 || Socorro || LINEAR ||  || align=right data-sort-value="0.97" | 970 m || 
|-id=195 bgcolor=#E9E9E9
| 612195 ||  || — || October 29, 2000 || Kitt Peak || Spacewatch ||  || align=right | 1.2 km || 
|-id=196 bgcolor=#E9E9E9
| 612196 ||  || — || November 1, 2000 || Socorro || LINEAR ||  || align=right data-sort-value="0.68" | 680 m || 
|-id=197 bgcolor=#FFC2E0
| 612197 ||  || — || November 21, 2000 || Socorro || LINEAR || ATE || align=right data-sort-value="0.092" | 92 m || 
|-id=198 bgcolor=#FA8072
| 612198 ||  || — || November 20, 2000 || Socorro || LINEAR ||  || align=right data-sort-value="0.56" | 560 m || 
|-id=199 bgcolor=#FFC2E0
| 612199 ||  || — || November 26, 2000 || Socorro || LINEAR || APO || align=right data-sort-value="0.35" | 350 m || 
|-id=200 bgcolor=#E9E9E9
| 612200 ||  || — || November 20, 2000 || Kitt Peak || Spacewatch ||  || align=right data-sort-value="0.74" | 740 m || 
|}

612201–612300 

|-bgcolor=#E9E9E9
| 612201 ||  || — || November 17, 2000 || Kitt Peak || Spacewatch ||  || align=right data-sort-value="0.69" | 690 m || 
|-id=202 bgcolor=#FFC2E0
| 612202 ||  || — || November 29, 2000 || Anderson Mesa || LONEOS || AMO || align=right data-sort-value="0.28" | 280 m || 
|-id=203 bgcolor=#C2E0FF
| 612203 ||  || — || November 23, 2000 || Mauna Kea || Mauna Kea Obs. || cubewano (cold)mooncritical || align=right | 262 km || 
|-id=204 bgcolor=#d6d6d6
| 612204 ||  || — || November 26, 2000 || Mauna Kea || S. S. Sheppard, D. C. Jewitt || 3:2 || align=right | 2.4 km || 
|-id=205 bgcolor=#E9E9E9
| 612205 ||  || — || November 24, 2000 || Kitt Peak || DLS ||  || align=right | 1.1 km || 
|-id=206 bgcolor=#E9E9E9
| 612206 ||  || — || December 5, 2000 || Bohyunsan || Y.-B. Jeon, B.-C. Lee ||  || align=right | 1.9 km || 
|-id=207 bgcolor=#FA8072
| 612207 ||  || — || December 15, 2000 || Socorro || LINEAR ||  || align=right | 1.0 km || 
|-id=208 bgcolor=#C2E0FF
| 612208 ||  || — || December 17, 2000 || Kitt Peak || Kitt Peak Obs. || plutinocritical || align=right | 121 km || 
|-id=209 bgcolor=#fefefe
| 612209 ||  || — || December 20, 2000 || Kitt Peak || DLS ||  || align=right | 1.8 km || 
|-id=210 bgcolor=#FFC2E0
| 612210 ||  || — || January 26, 2001 || Socorro || LINEAR || APO || align=right data-sort-value="0.29" | 290 m || 
|-id=211 bgcolor=#fefefe
| 612211 ||  || — || February 20, 2001 || Haleakala || NEAT ||  || align=right data-sort-value="0.72" | 720 m || 
|-id=212 bgcolor=#d6d6d6
| 612212 ||  || — || March 18, 2001 || Socorro || LINEAR ||  || align=right | 2.1 km || 
|-id=213 bgcolor=#C2E0FF
| 612213 ||  || — || March 25, 2001 || Kitt Peak || M. W. Buie || cubewano (cold)critical || align=right | 128 km || 
|-id=214 bgcolor=#C2E0FF
| 612214 ||  || — || March 25, 2001 || Kitt Peak || M. W. Buie || cubewano (cold)critical || align=right | 193 km || 
|-id=215 bgcolor=#fefefe
| 612215 ||  || — || March 21, 2001 || Kitt Peak || SKADS || MAS || align=right data-sort-value="0.57" | 570 m || 
|-id=216 bgcolor=#E9E9E9
| 612216 ||  || — || March 22, 2001 || Kitt Peak || SKADS ||  || align=right data-sort-value="0.85" | 850 m || 
|-id=217 bgcolor=#C2E0FF
| 612217 ||  || — || April 26, 2001 || La Silla || O. R. Hainaut, A. C. Delsanti || cubewano (cold)critical || align=right | 215 km || 
|-id=218 bgcolor=#C2E0FF
| 612218 ||  || — || May 24, 2001 || Cerro Tololo || M. W. Buie || plutinocritical || align=right | 335 km || 
|-id=219 bgcolor=#fefefe
| 612219 ||  || — || June 20, 2001 || Siding Spring || R. H. McNaught ||  || align=right data-sort-value="0.88" | 880 m || 
|-id=220 bgcolor=#E9E9E9
| 612220 ||  || — || July 19, 2001 || Palomar || NEAT ||  || align=right | 1.6 km || 
|-id=221 bgcolor=#FA8072
| 612221 ||  || — || August 9, 2001 || Palomar || NEAT ||  || align=right data-sort-value="0.79" | 790 m || 
|-id=222 bgcolor=#E9E9E9
| 612222 ||  || — || August 13, 2001 || Haleakala || NEAT ||  || align=right | 1.3 km || 
|-id=223 bgcolor=#C7FF8F
| 612223 ||  || — || August 16, 2001 || Socorro || LINEAR || unusual || align=right | 3.5 km || 
|-id=224 bgcolor=#E9E9E9
| 612224 ||  || — || August 16, 2001 || Socorro || LINEAR ||  || align=right data-sort-value="0.87" | 870 m || 
|-id=225 bgcolor=#FA8072
| 612225 ||  || — || August 17, 2001 || Socorro || LINEAR ||  || align=right data-sort-value="0.54" | 540 m || 
|-id=226 bgcolor=#FA8072
| 612226 ||  || — || August 16, 2001 || Socorro || LINEAR ||  || align=right | 1.7 km || 
|-id=227 bgcolor=#FFC2E0
| 612227 ||  || — || August 17, 2001 || Palomar || NEAT || APOPHA || align=right data-sort-value="0.32" | 320 m || 
|-id=228 bgcolor=#fefefe
| 612228 ||  || — || August 21, 2001 || Kitt Peak || Spacewatch || MAS || align=right data-sort-value="0.57" | 570 m || 
|-id=229 bgcolor=#FA8072
| 612229 ||  || — || August 23, 2001 || Socorro || LINEAR || H || align=right data-sort-value="0.87" | 870 m || 
|-id=230 bgcolor=#E9E9E9
| 612230 ||  || — || August 20, 2001 || Ondrejov || P. Pravec, P. Kušnirák ||  || align=right | 2.0 km || 
|-id=231 bgcolor=#E9E9E9
| 612231 ||  || — || August 17, 2001 || Socorro || LINEAR ||  || align=right | 1.5 km || 
|-id=232 bgcolor=#d6d6d6
| 612232 ||  || — || August 19, 2001 || Socorro || LINEAR ||  || align=right | 2.4 km || 
|-id=233 bgcolor=#d6d6d6
| 612233 ||  || — || August 20, 2001 || Socorro || LINEAR ||  || align=right | 2.8 km || 
|-id=234 bgcolor=#E9E9E9
| 612234 ||  || — || August 21, 2001 || Haleakala || NEAT ||  || align=right | 1.9 km || 
|-id=235 bgcolor=#fefefe
| 612235 ||  || — || August 26, 2001 || Haleakala || NEAT ||  || align=right data-sort-value="0.67" | 670 m || 
|-id=236 bgcolor=#C2E0FF
| 612236 ||  || — || August 19, 2001 || Cerro Tololo || M. W. Buie || cubewano (cold)critical || align=right | 208 km || 
|-id=237 bgcolor=#C2E0FF
| 612237 ||  || — || August 19, 2001 || Cerro Tololo || M. W. Buie || cubewano (cold)critical || align=right | 187 km || 
|-id=238 bgcolor=#C2E0FF
| 612238 ||  || — || August 20, 2001 || Cerro Tololo || M. W. Buie || cubewano (hot)critical || align=right | 200 km || 
|-id=239 bgcolor=#C2E0FF
| 612239 ||  || — || August 21, 2001 || Cerro Tololo || M. W. Buie || other TNOmooncritical || align=right | 205 km || 
|-id=240 bgcolor=#C2E0FF
| 612240 ||  || — || August 19, 2001 || Cerro Tololo || M. W. Buie || res4:7 || align=right | 128 km || 
|-id=241 bgcolor=#C2E0FF
| 612241 ||  || — || August 19, 2001 || Cerro Tololo || M. W. Buie || plutinocritical || align=right | 107 km || 
|-id=242 bgcolor=#C2E0FF
| 612242 ||  || — || August 21, 2001 || Cerro Tololo || M. W. Buie || cubewano (cold)mooncritical || align=right | 213 km || 
|-id=243 bgcolor=#C2E0FF
| 612243 ||  || — || August 21, 2001 || Cerro Tololo || M. W. Buie || NT || align=right | 105 km || 
|-id=244 bgcolor=#C2E0FF
| 612244 ||  || — || August 19, 2001 || Cerro Tololo || M. W. Buie || cubewano (cold)critical || align=right | 178 km || 
|-id=245 bgcolor=#C2E0FF
| 612245 ||  || — || August 19, 2001 || La Palma || La Palma Obs. || SDOcritical || align=right | 223 km || 
|-id=246 bgcolor=#fefefe
| 612246 ||  || — || September 9, 2001 || Socorro || LINEAR ||  || align=right | 1.0 km || 
|-id=247 bgcolor=#fefefe
| 612247 ||  || — || September 12, 2001 || Socorro || LINEAR ||  || align=right data-sort-value="0.85" | 850 m || 
|-id=248 bgcolor=#fefefe
| 612248 ||  || — || September 12, 2001 || Socorro || LINEAR ||  || align=right data-sort-value="0.91" | 910 m || 
|-id=249 bgcolor=#fefefe
| 612249 ||  || — || September 12, 2001 || Socorro || LINEAR || NYS || align=right data-sort-value="0.62" | 620 m || 
|-id=250 bgcolor=#fefefe
| 612250 ||  || — || September 12, 2001 || Socorro || LINEAR ||  || align=right data-sort-value="0.52" | 520 m || 
|-id=251 bgcolor=#fefefe
| 612251 ||  || — || September 12, 2001 || Socorro || LINEAR || NYS || align=right data-sort-value="0.64" | 640 m || 
|-id=252 bgcolor=#fefefe
| 612252 ||  || — || September 12, 2001 || Socorro || LINEAR ||  || align=right data-sort-value="0.73" | 730 m || 
|-id=253 bgcolor=#E9E9E9
| 612253 ||  || — || September 12, 2001 || Socorro || LINEAR ||  || align=right | 2.2 km || 
|-id=254 bgcolor=#E9E9E9
| 612254 ||  || — || September 16, 2001 || Socorro || LINEAR ||  || align=right | 1.7 km || 
|-id=255 bgcolor=#E9E9E9
| 612255 ||  || — || September 16, 2001 || Socorro || LINEAR ||  || align=right | 2.6 km || 
|-id=256 bgcolor=#fefefe
| 612256 ||  || — || September 20, 2001 || Socorro || LINEAR || NYS || align=right data-sort-value="0.58" | 580 m || 
|-id=257 bgcolor=#fefefe
| 612257 ||  || — || September 20, 2001 || Socorro || LINEAR ||  || align=right data-sort-value="0.71" | 710 m || 
|-id=258 bgcolor=#fefefe
| 612258 ||  || — || September 16, 2001 || Socorro || LINEAR ||  || align=right data-sort-value="0.72" | 720 m || 
|-id=259 bgcolor=#fefefe
| 612259 ||  || — || September 16, 2001 || Socorro || LINEAR ||  || align=right data-sort-value="0.65" | 650 m || 
|-id=260 bgcolor=#fefefe
| 612260 ||  || — || September 16, 2001 || Socorro || LINEAR ||  || align=right | 1.8 km || 
|-id=261 bgcolor=#E9E9E9
| 612261 ||  || — || September 17, 2001 || Socorro || LINEAR ||  || align=right | 1.5 km || 
|-id=262 bgcolor=#FA8072
| 612262 ||  || — || September 19, 2001 || Socorro || LINEAR ||  || align=right data-sort-value="0.71" | 710 m || 
|-id=263 bgcolor=#fefefe
| 612263 ||  || — || September 19, 2001 || Socorro || LINEAR ||  || align=right data-sort-value="0.61" | 610 m || 
|-id=264 bgcolor=#fefefe
| 612264 ||  || — || September 19, 2001 || Socorro || LINEAR || MAS || align=right data-sort-value="0.66" | 660 m || 
|-id=265 bgcolor=#fefefe
| 612265 ||  || — || September 19, 2001 || Socorro || LINEAR ||  || align=right data-sort-value="0.62" | 620 m || 
|-id=266 bgcolor=#fefefe
| 612266 ||  || — || September 19, 2001 || Kitt Peak || Spacewatch ||  || align=right data-sort-value="0.57" | 570 m || 
|-id=267 bgcolor=#FFC2E0
| 612267 ||  || — || September 27, 2001 || Socorro || LINEAR || APOPHA || align=right data-sort-value="0.23" | 230 m || 
|-id=268 bgcolor=#fefefe
| 612268 ||  || — || September 20, 2001 || Socorro || LINEAR ||  || align=right data-sort-value="0.55" | 550 m || 
|-id=269 bgcolor=#fefefe
| 612269 ||  || — || September 20, 2001 || Socorro || LINEAR ||  || align=right data-sort-value="0.68" | 680 m || 
|-id=270 bgcolor=#E9E9E9
| 612270 ||  || — || September 20, 2001 || Socorro || LINEAR ||  || align=right data-sort-value="0.75" | 750 m || 
|-id=271 bgcolor=#fefefe
| 612271 ||  || — || September 23, 2001 || Socorro || LINEAR ||  || align=right data-sort-value="0.68" | 680 m || 
|-id=272 bgcolor=#fefefe
| 612272 ||  || — || September 26, 2001 || Socorro || LINEAR ||  || align=right data-sort-value="0.63" | 630 m || 
|-id=273 bgcolor=#fefefe
| 612273 ||  || — || September 19, 2001 || Socorro || LINEAR ||  || align=right data-sort-value="0.55" | 550 m || 
|-id=274 bgcolor=#fefefe
| 612274 ||  || — || September 26, 2001 || Palomar || NEAT ||  || align=right data-sort-value="0.78" | 780 m || 
|-id=275 bgcolor=#FA8072
| 612275 ||  || — || October 10, 2001 || Palomar || NEAT ||  || align=right | 1.1 km || 
|-id=276 bgcolor=#E9E9E9
| 612276 ||  || — || October 13, 2001 || Socorro || LINEAR ||  || align=right | 1.2 km || 
|-id=277 bgcolor=#E9E9E9
| 612277 ||  || — || October 15, 2001 || Desert Eagle || W. K. Y. Yeung ||  || align=right | 1.7 km || 
|-id=278 bgcolor=#fefefe
| 612278 ||  || — || October 11, 2001 || Palomar || NEAT ||  || align=right data-sort-value="0.53" | 530 m || 
|-id=279 bgcolor=#fefefe
| 612279 ||  || — || October 14, 2001 || Socorro || LINEAR ||  || align=right data-sort-value="0.67" | 670 m || 
|-id=280 bgcolor=#fefefe
| 612280 ||  || — || October 14, 2001 || Socorro || LINEAR || MAS || align=right data-sort-value="0.63" | 630 m || 
|-id=281 bgcolor=#d6d6d6
| 612281 ||  || — || October 14, 2001 || Socorro || LINEAR ||  || align=right | 1.9 km || 
|-id=282 bgcolor=#fefefe
| 612282 ||  || — || October 15, 2001 || Socorro || LINEAR ||  || align=right data-sort-value="0.55" | 550 m || 
|-id=283 bgcolor=#E9E9E9
| 612283 ||  || — || October 15, 2001 || Kitt Peak || Spacewatch ||  || align=right data-sort-value="0.93" | 930 m || 
|-id=284 bgcolor=#FA8072
| 612284 ||  || — || October 15, 2001 || Palomar || NEAT ||  || align=right data-sort-value="0.61" | 610 m || 
|-id=285 bgcolor=#fefefe
| 612285 ||  || — || October 14, 2001 || Apache Point || SDSS ||  || align=right data-sort-value="0.68" | 680 m || 
|-id=286 bgcolor=#E9E9E9
| 612286 ||  || — || October 14, 2001 || Apache Point || SDSS || RAF || align=right data-sort-value="0.87" | 870 m || 
|-id=287 bgcolor=#E9E9E9
| 612287 ||  || — || October 14, 2001 || Apache Point || SDSS ||  || align=right data-sort-value="0.73" | 730 m || 
|-id=288 bgcolor=#d6d6d6
| 612288 ||  || — || October 14, 2001 || Apache Point || SDSS || THB || align=right | 2.2 km || 
|-id=289 bgcolor=#E9E9E9
| 612289 ||  || — || October 14, 2001 || Apache Point || SDSS ||  || align=right | 1.9 km || 
|-id=290 bgcolor=#FA8072
| 612290 ||  || — || October 25, 2001 || Socorro || LINEAR ||  || align=right data-sort-value="0.87" | 870 m || 
|-id=291 bgcolor=#E9E9E9
| 612291 ||  || — || October 17, 2001 || Socorro || LINEAR || AEO || align=right | 1.8 km || 
|-id=292 bgcolor=#fefefe
| 612292 ||  || — || October 17, 2001 || Socorro || LINEAR || NYS || align=right data-sort-value="0.69" | 690 m || 
|-id=293 bgcolor=#d6d6d6
| 612293 ||  || — || October 20, 2001 || Socorro || LINEAR ||  || align=right | 2.6 km || 
|-id=294 bgcolor=#d6d6d6
| 612294 ||  || — || October 17, 2001 || Kitt Peak || Spacewatch ||  || align=right | 1.8 km || 
|-id=295 bgcolor=#d6d6d6
| 612295 ||  || — || October 20, 2001 || Kitt Peak || Spacewatch ||  || align=right | 1.3 km || 
|-id=296 bgcolor=#fefefe
| 612296 ||  || — || October 21, 2001 || Kitt Peak || Spacewatch ||  || align=right data-sort-value="0.50" | 500 m || 
|-id=297 bgcolor=#fefefe
| 612297 ||  || — || October 20, 2001 || Socorro || LINEAR ||  || align=right data-sort-value="0.51" | 510 m || 
|-id=298 bgcolor=#fefefe
| 612298 ||  || — || October 20, 2001 || Socorro || LINEAR || NYS || align=right data-sort-value="0.66" | 660 m || 
|-id=299 bgcolor=#fefefe
| 612299 ||  || — || October 23, 2001 || Socorro || LINEAR ||  || align=right data-sort-value="0.64" | 640 m || 
|-id=300 bgcolor=#fefefe
| 612300 ||  || — || October 18, 2001 || Palomar || NEAT ||  || align=right data-sort-value="0.52" | 520 m || 
|}

612301–612400 

|-bgcolor=#fefefe
| 612301 ||  || — || October 18, 2001 || Palomar || NEAT || NYS || align=right data-sort-value="0.49" | 490 m || 
|-id=302 bgcolor=#fefefe
| 612302 ||  || — || October 19, 2001 || Palomar || NEAT ||  || align=right data-sort-value="0.48" | 480 m || 
|-id=303 bgcolor=#fefefe
| 612303 ||  || — || October 16, 2001 || Palomar || NEAT ||  || align=right data-sort-value="0.51" | 510 m || 
|-id=304 bgcolor=#E9E9E9
| 612304 ||  || — || November 9, 2001 || Socorro || LINEAR ||  || align=right | 2.9 km || 
|-id=305 bgcolor=#d6d6d6
| 612305 ||  || — || November 10, 2001 || Socorro || LINEAR ||  || align=right | 2.2 km || 
|-id=306 bgcolor=#fefefe
| 612306 ||  || — || November 11, 2001 || Kitt Peak || Spacewatch ||  || align=right data-sort-value="0.54" | 540 m || 
|-id=307 bgcolor=#d6d6d6
| 612307 ||  || — || November 9, 2001 || Socorro || LINEAR ||  || align=right | 2.0 km || 
|-id=308 bgcolor=#d6d6d6
| 612308 ||  || — || November 9, 2001 || Socorro || LINEAR ||  || align=right | 2.0 km || 
|-id=309 bgcolor=#d6d6d6
| 612309 ||  || — || November 11, 2001 || Apache Point || SDSS || Tj (2.97) || align=right | 2.5 km || 
|-id=310 bgcolor=#d6d6d6
| 612310 ||  || — || November 17, 2001 || Kitt Peak || Spacewatch ||  || align=right | 2.0 km || 
|-id=311 bgcolor=#FA8072
| 612311 ||  || — || November 22, 2001 || Kitt Peak || Spacewatch ||  || align=right data-sort-value="0.52" | 520 m || 
|-id=312 bgcolor=#fefefe
| 612312 ||  || — || November 17, 2001 || Kitt Peak || Spacewatch ||  || align=right data-sort-value="0.70" | 700 m || 
|-id=313 bgcolor=#fefefe
| 612313 ||  || — || November 17, 2001 || Socorro || LINEAR ||  || align=right data-sort-value="0.69" | 690 m || 
|-id=314 bgcolor=#fefefe
| 612314 ||  || — || November 18, 2001 || Socorro || LINEAR ||  || align=right data-sort-value="0.67" | 670 m || 
|-id=315 bgcolor=#fefefe
| 612315 ||  || — || November 20, 2001 || Socorro || LINEAR ||  || align=right data-sort-value="0.55" | 550 m || 
|-id=316 bgcolor=#fefefe
| 612316 ||  || — || November 20, 2001 || Socorro || LINEAR ||  || align=right data-sort-value="0.54" | 540 m || 
|-id=317 bgcolor=#fefefe
| 612317 ||  || — || November 20, 2001 || Socorro || LINEAR ||  || align=right data-sort-value="0.80" | 800 m || 
|-id=318 bgcolor=#FA8072
| 612318 ||  || — || December 14, 2001 || Socorro || LINEAR ||  || align=right | 1.1 km || 
|-id=319 bgcolor=#fefefe
| 612319 ||  || — || December 10, 2001 || Socorro || LINEAR ||  || align=right data-sort-value="0.92" | 920 m || 
|-id=320 bgcolor=#B88A00
| 612320 ||  || — || December 15, 2001 || Socorro || LINEAR || Tj (2.9) || align=right | 1.00 km || 
|-id=321 bgcolor=#d6d6d6
| 612321 ||  || — || December 18, 2001 || Apache Point || SDSS ||  || align=right | 1.4 km || 
|-id=322 bgcolor=#d6d6d6
| 612322 ||  || — || January 12, 2002 || Cerro Tololo || DLS || EOS || align=right | 1.9 km || 
|-id=323 bgcolor=#E9E9E9
| 612323 ||  || — || January 9, 2002 || Socorro || LINEAR ||  || align=right | 2.2 km || 
|-id=324 bgcolor=#FFC2E0
| 612324 ||  || — || January 15, 2002 || Kingsnake || J. V. McClusky || AMO +1km || align=right data-sort-value="0.91" | 910 m || 
|-id=325 bgcolor=#d6d6d6
| 612325 ||  || — || January 13, 2002 || Kitt Peak || Spacewatch ||  || align=right | 1.9 km || 
|-id=326 bgcolor=#FFC2E0
| 612326 ||  || — || February 7, 2002 || Kitt Peak || Spacewatch || APOPHA || align=right data-sort-value="0.29" | 290 m || 
|-id=327 bgcolor=#FA8072
| 612327 ||  || — || February 10, 2002 || Socorro || LINEAR ||  || align=right data-sort-value="0.41" | 410 m || 
|-id=328 bgcolor=#E9E9E9
| 612328 ||  || — || February 12, 2002 || Desert Eagle || W. K. Y. Yeung ||  || align=right | 1.5 km || 
|-id=329 bgcolor=#E9E9E9
| 612329 ||  || — || February 7, 2002 || Socorro || LINEAR || BAR || align=right | 1.3 km || 
|-id=330 bgcolor=#fefefe
| 612330 ||  || — || February 7, 2002 || Socorro || LINEAR ||  || align=right data-sort-value="0.69" | 690 m || 
|-id=331 bgcolor=#fefefe
| 612331 ||  || — || February 7, 2002 || Socorro || LINEAR ||  || align=right data-sort-value="0.97" | 970 m || 
|-id=332 bgcolor=#C2E0FF
| 612332 ||  || — || February 6, 2002 || Kitt Peak || M. W. Buie || plutinocritical || align=right | 165 km || 
|-id=333 bgcolor=#C2E0FF
| 612333 ||  || — || February 7, 2002 || Kitt Peak || M. W. Buie || cubewano (cold)critical || align=right | 180 km || 
|-id=334 bgcolor=#E9E9E9
| 612334 ||  || — || February 11, 2002 || Socorro || LINEAR ||  || align=right data-sort-value="0.58" | 580 m || 
|-id=335 bgcolor=#d6d6d6
| 612335 ||  || — || February 7, 2002 || Palomar || NEAT || EOS || align=right | 2.9 km || 
|-id=336 bgcolor=#E9E9E9
| 612336 ||  || — || March 6, 2002 || Palomar || NEAT ||  || align=right | 1.5 km || 
|-id=337 bgcolor=#FFC2E0
| 612337 ||  || — || March 6, 2002 || Kitt Peak || Spacewatch || APOPHA || align=right data-sort-value="0.46" | 460 m || 
|-id=338 bgcolor=#E9E9E9
| 612338 ||  || — || March 9, 2002 || Socorro || LINEAR ||  || align=right data-sort-value="0.94" | 940 m || 
|-id=339 bgcolor=#d6d6d6
| 612339 ||  || — || March 12, 2002 || Palomar || NEAT ||  || align=right | 2.4 km || 
|-id=340 bgcolor=#fefefe
| 612340 ||  || — || March 12, 2002 || Kitt Peak || Spacewatch || NYS || align=right data-sort-value="0.58" | 580 m || 
|-id=341 bgcolor=#E9E9E9
| 612341 ||  || — || March 13, 2002 || Socorro || LINEAR ||  || align=right data-sort-value="0.81" | 810 m || 
|-id=342 bgcolor=#FFC2E0
| 612342 ||  || — || March 16, 2002 || Anderson Mesa || LONEOS || APOPHA || align=right data-sort-value="0.52" | 520 m || 
|-id=343 bgcolor=#FFC2E0
| 612343 ||  || — || March 23, 2002 || Socorro || LINEAR || ATE || align=right data-sort-value="0.10" | 100 m || 
|-id=344 bgcolor=#E9E9E9
| 612344 ||  || — || March 16, 2002 || Socorro || LINEAR ||  || align=right data-sort-value="0.98" | 980 m || 
|-id=345 bgcolor=#E9E9E9
| 612345 ||  || — || April 5, 2002 || Palomar || NEAT ||  || align=right | 1.8 km || 
|-id=346 bgcolor=#FFC2E0
| 612346 ||  || — || April 11, 2002 || Palomar || NEAT || APO || align=right data-sort-value="0.24" | 240 m || 
|-id=347 bgcolor=#E9E9E9
| 612347 ||  || — || April 4, 2002 || Palomar || NEAT ||  || align=right | 1.3 km || 
|-id=348 bgcolor=#FFC2E0
| 612348 ||  || — || April 12, 2002 || Socorro || LINEAR || AMOPHA || align=right data-sort-value="0.64" | 640 m || 
|-id=349 bgcolor=#C2E0FF
| 612349 ||  || — || April 8, 2002 || Cerro Tololo || M. W. Buie || other TNOcritical || align=right | 248 km || 
|-id=350 bgcolor=#C2E0FF
| 612350 ||  || — || April 6, 2002 || Cerro Tololo || M. W. Buie || res2:5critical || align=right | 171 km || 
|-id=351 bgcolor=#C2E0FF
| 612351 ||  || — || April 8, 2002 || Cerro Tololo || M. W. Buie || plutinocritical || align=right | 147 km || 
|-id=352 bgcolor=#C2E0FF
| 612352 ||  || — || April 6, 2002 || Cerro Tololo || M. W. Buie || plutinocritical || align=right | 146 km || 
|-id=353 bgcolor=#fefefe
| 612353 ||  || — || April 10, 2002 || Socorro || LINEAR ||  || align=right data-sort-value="0.58" | 580 m || 
|-id=354 bgcolor=#E9E9E9
| 612354 ||  || — || April 8, 2002 || Palomar || NEAT ||  || align=right data-sort-value="0.73" | 730 m || 
|-id=355 bgcolor=#d6d6d6
| 612355 ||  || — || April 8, 2002 || Palomar || NEAT ||  || align=right | 2.8 km || 
|-id=356 bgcolor=#FFC2E0
| 612356 ||  || — || May 4, 2002 || Socorro || LINEAR || ATEPHA || align=right data-sort-value="0.29" | 290 m || 
|-id=357 bgcolor=#FFC2E0
| 612357 ||  || — || May 6, 2002 || Kitt Peak || Spacewatch || APO || align=right data-sort-value="0.68" | 680 m || 
|-id=358 bgcolor=#FFC2E0
| 612358 ||  || — || May 6, 2002 || Socorro || LINEAR || APOPHA || align=right data-sort-value="0.19" | 190 m || 
|-id=359 bgcolor=#d6d6d6
| 612359 ||  || — || May 8, 2002 || Haleakala || NEAT || Tj (2.91) || align=right | 2.3 km || 
|-id=360 bgcolor=#FA8072
| 612360 ||  || — || May 9, 2002 || Socorro || LINEAR ||  || align=right data-sort-value="0.52" | 520 m || 
|-id=361 bgcolor=#d6d6d6
| 612361 ||  || — || May 11, 2002 || Socorro || LINEAR || 7:4 || align=right | 3.5 km || 
|-id=362 bgcolor=#FFC2E0
| 612362 ||  || — || May 13, 2002 || Socorro || LINEAR || APO || align=right data-sort-value="0.38" | 380 m || 
|-id=363 bgcolor=#FFC2E0
| 612363 ||  || — || May 18, 2002 || Anderson Mesa || LONEOS || AMOcritical || align=right data-sort-value="0.77" | 770 m || 
|-id=364 bgcolor=#FFC2E0
| 612364 ||  || — || June 10, 2002 || Anderson Mesa || LONEOS || APO || align=right data-sort-value="0.33" | 330 m || 
|-id=365 bgcolor=#E9E9E9
| 612365 ||  || — || June 10, 2002 || Palomar || NEAT ||  || align=right data-sort-value="0.96" | 960 m || 
|-id=366 bgcolor=#fefefe
| 612366 ||  || — || June 28, 2002 || Palomar || NEAT || Tj (2.78) || align=right | 1.3 km || 
|-id=367 bgcolor=#FA8072
| 612367 ||  || — || July 9, 2002 || Socorro || LINEAR ||  || align=right data-sort-value="0.82" | 820 m || 
|-id=368 bgcolor=#d6d6d6
| 612368 ||  || — || July 12, 2002 || Palomar || NEAT || Tj (2.97) || align=right | 1.9 km || 
|-id=369 bgcolor=#fefefe
| 612369 ||  || — || July 14, 2002 || Palomar || NEAT ||  || align=right data-sort-value="0.53" | 530 m || 
|-id=370 bgcolor=#d6d6d6
| 612370 ||  || — || July 9, 2002 || Palomar || NEAT ||  || align=right | 2.5 km || 
|-id=371 bgcolor=#E9E9E9
| 612371 ||  || — || July 9, 2002 || Palomar || NEAT ||  || align=right data-sort-value="0.91" | 910 m || 
|-id=372 bgcolor=#fefefe
| 612372 ||  || — || July 9, 2002 || Palomar || NEAT ||  || align=right data-sort-value="0.67" | 670 m || 
|-id=373 bgcolor=#E9E9E9
| 612373 ||  || — || July 9, 2002 || Palomar || NEAT ||  || align=right | 2.1 km || 
|-id=374 bgcolor=#FA8072
| 612374 ||  || — || July 29, 2002 || Palomar || NEAT || H || align=right data-sort-value="0.61" | 610 m || 
|-id=375 bgcolor=#E9E9E9
| 612375 ||  || — || July 21, 2002 || Palomar || NEAT || BAR || align=right | 1.2 km || 
|-id=376 bgcolor=#d6d6d6
| 612376 ||  || — || July 29, 2002 || Palomar || NEAT || THM || align=right | 1.9 km || 
|-id=377 bgcolor=#d6d6d6
| 612377 ||  || — || July 17, 2002 || Palomar || NEAT || 3:2 || align=right | 4.9 km || 
|-id=378 bgcolor=#d6d6d6
| 612378 ||  || — || August 4, 2002 || Palomar || NEAT ||  || align=right | 1.9 km || 
|-id=379 bgcolor=#E9E9E9
| 612379 ||  || — || August 2, 2002 || Campo Imperatore || CINEOS ||  || align=right data-sort-value="0.88" | 880 m || 
|-id=380 bgcolor=#FFC2E0
| 612380 ||  || — || August 10, 2002 || Socorro || LINEAR || AMOPHA || align=right data-sort-value="0.24" | 240 m || 
|-id=381 bgcolor=#FA8072
| 612381 ||  || — || August 12, 2002 || Anderson Mesa || LONEOS ||  || align=right data-sort-value="0.54" | 540 m || 
|-id=382 bgcolor=#E9E9E9
| 612382 ||  || — || August 11, 2002 || Socorro || LINEAR ||  || align=right | 1.0 km || 
|-id=383 bgcolor=#FFC2E0
| 612383 ||  || — || August 12, 2002 || Socorro || LINEAR || AMO || align=right data-sort-value="0.47" | 470 m || 
|-id=384 bgcolor=#fefefe
| 612384 ||  || — || August 14, 2002 || Socorro || LINEAR ||  || align=right data-sort-value="0.86" | 860 m || 
|-id=385 bgcolor=#FA8072
| 612385 ||  || — || August 6, 2002 || Palomar || NEAT ||  || align=right data-sort-value="0.41" | 410 m || 
|-id=386 bgcolor=#fefefe
| 612386 ||  || — || August 10, 2002 || Cerro Tololo || M. W. Buie ||  || align=right data-sort-value="0.69" | 690 m || 
|-id=387 bgcolor=#fefefe
| 612387 ||  || — || August 7, 2002 || Palomar || NEAT ||  || align=right data-sort-value="0.51" | 510 m || 
|-id=388 bgcolor=#C2E0FF
| 612388 ||  || — || August 5, 2002 || Mauna Kea || Mauna Kea Obs. || cubewano (cold) || align=right | 245 km || 
|-id=389 bgcolor=#d6d6d6
| 612389 ||  || — || August 15, 2002 || Palomar || NEAT || EUP || align=right | 3.0 km || 
|-id=390 bgcolor=#E9E9E9
| 612390 ||  || — || August 14, 2002 || Palomar || NEAT || EUN || align=right | 1.3 km || 
|-id=391 bgcolor=#fefefe
| 612391 ||  || — || August 11, 2002 || Palomar || NEAT ||  || align=right data-sort-value="0.57" | 570 m || 
|-id=392 bgcolor=#E9E9E9
| 612392 ||  || — || August 11, 2002 || Palomar || NEAT ||  || align=right | 1.1 km || 
|-id=393 bgcolor=#d6d6d6
| 612393 ||  || — || August 11, 2002 || Palomar || NEAT ||  || align=right | 2.5 km || 
|-id=394 bgcolor=#E9E9E9
| 612394 ||  || — || August 15, 2002 || Palomar || NEAT || DOR || align=right | 2.0 km || 
|-id=395 bgcolor=#FA8072
| 612395 ||  || — || August 16, 2002 || Haleakala || NEAT ||  || align=right data-sort-value="0.67" | 670 m || 
|-id=396 bgcolor=#E9E9E9
| 612396 ||  || — || August 16, 2002 || Palomar || NEAT ||  || align=right data-sort-value="0.83" | 830 m || 
|-id=397 bgcolor=#fefefe
| 612397 ||  || — || August 17, 2002 || Palomar || NEAT ||  || align=right data-sort-value="0.83" | 830 m || 
|-id=398 bgcolor=#fefefe
| 612398 ||  || — || August 26, 2002 || Palomar || NEAT ||  || align=right data-sort-value="0.60" | 600 m || 
|-id=399 bgcolor=#FA8072
| 612399 ||  || — || August 30, 2002 || Palomar || NEAT ||  || align=right data-sort-value="0.52" | 520 m || 
|-id=400 bgcolor=#E9E9E9
| 612400 ||  || — || August 18, 2002 || Palomar || S. F. Hönig ||  || align=right | 1.2 km || 
|}

612401–612500 

|-bgcolor=#E9E9E9
| 612401 ||  || — || August 16, 2002 || Palomar || A. Lowe ||  || align=right data-sort-value="0.77" | 770 m || 
|-id=402 bgcolor=#E9E9E9
| 612402 ||  || — || August 28, 2002 || Palomar || R. Matson ||  || align=right data-sort-value="0.63" | 630 m || 
|-id=403 bgcolor=#fefefe
| 612403 ||  || — || August 29, 2002 || Palomar || S. F. Hönig || MAS || align=right data-sort-value="0.55" | 550 m || 
|-id=404 bgcolor=#fefefe
| 612404 ||  || — || August 29, 2002 || Palomar || S. F. Hönig ||  || align=right data-sort-value="0.60" | 600 m || 
|-id=405 bgcolor=#E9E9E9
| 612405 ||  || — || August 29, 2002 || Palomar || S. F. Hönig ||  || align=right data-sort-value="0.75" | 750 m || 
|-id=406 bgcolor=#E9E9E9
| 612406 ||  || — || August 19, 2002 || Palomar || NEAT ||  || align=right | 1.2 km || 
|-id=407 bgcolor=#E9E9E9
| 612407 ||  || — || August 18, 2002 || Palomar || NEAT ||  || align=right | 1.4 km || 
|-id=408 bgcolor=#fefefe
| 612408 ||  || — || August 18, 2002 || Palomar || NEAT || MAS || align=right data-sort-value="0.55" | 550 m || 
|-id=409 bgcolor=#E9E9E9
| 612409 ||  || — || August 28, 2002 || Palomar || NEAT ||  || align=right data-sort-value="0.81" | 810 m || 
|-id=410 bgcolor=#E9E9E9
| 612410 ||  || — || August 29, 2002 || Palomar || NEAT ||  || align=right | 1.6 km || 
|-id=411 bgcolor=#fefefe
| 612411 ||  || — || August 17, 2002 || Palomar || NEAT || MAS || align=right data-sort-value="0.52" | 520 m || 
|-id=412 bgcolor=#E9E9E9
| 612412 ||  || — || August 18, 2002 || Palomar || NEAT ||  || align=right | 1.8 km || 
|-id=413 bgcolor=#d6d6d6
| 612413 ||  || — || August 19, 2002 || Palomar || NEAT ||  || align=right | 2.6 km || 
|-id=414 bgcolor=#fefefe
| 612414 ||  || — || August 16, 2002 || Palomar || NEAT ||  || align=right data-sort-value="0.54" | 540 m || 
|-id=415 bgcolor=#d6d6d6
| 612415 ||  || — || August 29, 2002 || Palomar || NEAT || 3:2 || align=right | 4.2 km || 
|-id=416 bgcolor=#d6d6d6
| 612416 ||  || — || August 27, 2002 || Palomar || NEAT || THM || align=right | 2.2 km || 
|-id=417 bgcolor=#fefefe
| 612417 ||  || — || August 27, 2002 || Palomar || NEAT ||  || align=right data-sort-value="0.46" | 460 m || 
|-id=418 bgcolor=#fefefe
| 612418 ||  || — || August 30, 2002 || Palomar || NEAT ||  || align=right data-sort-value="0.54" | 540 m || 
|-id=419 bgcolor=#E9E9E9
| 612419 ||  || — || August 27, 2002 || Palomar || NEAT ||  || align=right | 1.3 km || 
|-id=420 bgcolor=#d6d6d6
| 612420 ||  || — || August 18, 2002 || Palomar || NEAT ||  || align=right | 2.0 km || 
|-id=421 bgcolor=#fefefe
| 612421 ||  || — || August 16, 2002 || Palomar || NEAT || NYS || align=right data-sort-value="0.50" | 500 m || 
|-id=422 bgcolor=#fefefe
| 612422 ||  || — || August 18, 2002 || Palomar || NEAT ||  || align=right data-sort-value="0.64" | 640 m || 
|-id=423 bgcolor=#fefefe
| 612423 ||  || — || August 27, 2002 || Palomar || NEAT ||  || align=right data-sort-value="0.70" | 700 m || 
|-id=424 bgcolor=#fefefe
| 612424 ||  || — || August 29, 2002 || Palomar || NEAT ||  || align=right data-sort-value="0.45" | 450 m || 
|-id=425 bgcolor=#fefefe
| 612425 ||  || — || August 19, 2002 || Palomar || NEAT ||  || align=right data-sort-value="0.59" | 590 m || 
|-id=426 bgcolor=#E9E9E9
| 612426 ||  || — || August 19, 2002 || Palomar || NEAT ||  || align=right data-sort-value="0.86" | 860 m || 
|-id=427 bgcolor=#fefefe
| 612427 ||  || — || August 27, 2002 || Palomar || NEAT ||  || align=right data-sort-value="0.47" | 470 m || 
|-id=428 bgcolor=#fefefe
| 612428 ||  || — || August 27, 2002 || Palomar || NEAT ||  || align=right data-sort-value="0.45" | 450 m || 
|-id=429 bgcolor=#fefefe
| 612429 ||  || — || August 27, 2002 || Palomar || NEAT ||  || align=right data-sort-value="0.50" | 500 m || 
|-id=430 bgcolor=#fefefe
| 612430 ||  || — || August 29, 2002 || Palomar || NEAT ||  || align=right data-sort-value="0.63" | 630 m || 
|-id=431 bgcolor=#d6d6d6
| 612431 ||  || — || August 18, 2002 || Palomar || NEAT ||  || align=right | 2.0 km || 
|-id=432 bgcolor=#d6d6d6
| 612432 ||  || — || August 19, 2002 || Palomar || NEAT ||  || align=right | 1.9 km || 
|-id=433 bgcolor=#E9E9E9
| 612433 ||  || — || August 27, 2002 || Palomar || NEAT ||  || align=right data-sort-value="0.72" | 720 m || 
|-id=434 bgcolor=#E9E9E9
| 612434 ||  || — || August 29, 2002 || Palomar || NEAT ||  || align=right data-sort-value="0.58" | 580 m || 
|-id=435 bgcolor=#d6d6d6
| 612435 ||  || — || August 16, 2002 || Palomar || NEAT ||  || align=right | 2.2 km || 
|-id=436 bgcolor=#fefefe
| 612436 ||  || — || August 30, 2002 || Palomar || NEAT || NYS || align=right data-sort-value="0.64" | 640 m || 
|-id=437 bgcolor=#d6d6d6
| 612437 ||  || — || August 29, 2002 || Palomar || NEAT ||  || align=right | 2.3 km || 
|-id=438 bgcolor=#E9E9E9
| 612438 ||  || — || August 29, 2002 || Palomar || NEAT ||  || align=right | 2.0 km || 
|-id=439 bgcolor=#d6d6d6
| 612439 ||  || — || August 18, 2002 || Palomar || NEAT || THM || align=right | 2.1 km || 
|-id=440 bgcolor=#E9E9E9
| 612440 ||  || — || August 28, 2002 || Palomar || NEAT ||  || align=right | 1.0 km || 
|-id=441 bgcolor=#fefefe
| 612441 ||  || — || August 17, 2002 || Palomar || NEAT ||  || align=right data-sort-value="0.49" | 490 m || 
|-id=442 bgcolor=#E9E9E9
| 612442 ||  || — || August 26, 2002 || Palomar || NEAT ||  || align=right data-sort-value="0.92" | 920 m || 
|-id=443 bgcolor=#FFC2E0
| 612443 ||  || — || September 4, 2002 || Anderson Mesa || LONEOS || ATE || align=right data-sort-value="0.22" | 220 m || 
|-id=444 bgcolor=#E9E9E9
| 612444 ||  || — || September 6, 2002 || Klet || Kleť Obs. ||  || align=right data-sort-value="0.81" | 810 m || 
|-id=445 bgcolor=#fefefe
| 612445 ||  || — || September 6, 2002 || Needville || Needville Obs. ||  || align=right data-sort-value="0.62" | 620 m || 
|-id=446 bgcolor=#FA8072
| 612446 ||  || — || September 6, 2002 || Socorro || LINEAR ||  || align=right data-sort-value="0.54" | 540 m || 
|-id=447 bgcolor=#FA8072
| 612447 ||  || — || September 8, 2002 || Campo Imperatore || CINEOS ||  || align=right data-sort-value="0.77" | 770 m || 
|-id=448 bgcolor=#fefefe
| 612448 ||  || — || September 11, 2002 || Palomar || NEAT ||  || align=right data-sort-value="0.57" | 570 m || 
|-id=449 bgcolor=#E9E9E9
| 612449 ||  || — || September 11, 2002 || Palomar || NEAT ||  || align=right | 2.1 km || 
|-id=450 bgcolor=#fefefe
| 612450 ||  || — || September 11, 2002 || Palomar || NEAT ||  || align=right data-sort-value="0.57" | 570 m || 
|-id=451 bgcolor=#fefefe
| 612451 ||  || — || September 12, 2002 || Palomar || NEAT ||  || align=right data-sort-value="0.56" | 560 m || 
|-id=452 bgcolor=#d6d6d6
| 612452 ||  || — || September 14, 2002 || Palomar || NEAT || 3:2 || align=right | 4.4 km || 
|-id=453 bgcolor=#E9E9E9
| 612453 ||  || — || September 15, 2002 || Kitt Peak || Spacewatch ||  || align=right | 1.2 km || 
|-id=454 bgcolor=#d6d6d6
| 612454 ||  || — || September 14, 2002 || Palomar || NEAT ||  || align=right | 2.0 km || 
|-id=455 bgcolor=#fefefe
| 612455 ||  || — || September 15, 2002 || Palomar || NEAT ||  || align=right data-sort-value="0.49" | 490 m || 
|-id=456 bgcolor=#E9E9E9
| 612456 ||  || — || September 15, 2002 || Haleakala || NEAT ||  || align=right data-sort-value="0.85" | 850 m || 
|-id=457 bgcolor=#E9E9E9
| 612457 ||  || — || September 13, 2002 || Palomar || NEAT ||  || align=right | 1.1 km || 
|-id=458 bgcolor=#E9E9E9
| 612458 ||  || — || September 13, 2002 || Palomar || NEAT ||  || align=right data-sort-value="0.90" | 900 m || 
|-id=459 bgcolor=#d6d6d6
| 612459 ||  || — || September 14, 2002 || Palomar || R. Matson ||  || align=right | 2.4 km || 
|-id=460 bgcolor=#fefefe
| 612460 ||  || — || September 14, 2002 || Palomar || R. Matson || BAP || align=right data-sort-value="0.53" | 530 m || 
|-id=461 bgcolor=#fefefe
| 612461 ||  || — || September 4, 2002 || Palomar || NEAT ||  || align=right | 1.7 km || 
|-id=462 bgcolor=#fefefe
| 612462 ||  || — || September 15, 2002 || Palomar || NEAT ||  || align=right data-sort-value="0.53" | 530 m || 
|-id=463 bgcolor=#fefefe
| 612463 ||  || — || September 1, 2002 || Palomar || NEAT ||  || align=right data-sort-value="0.45" | 450 m || 
|-id=464 bgcolor=#fefefe
| 612464 ||  || — || September 12, 2002 || Palomar || NEAT || NYS || align=right data-sort-value="0.67" | 670 m || 
|-id=465 bgcolor=#d6d6d6
| 612465 ||  || — || September 15, 2002 || Palomar || NEAT ||  || align=right | 1.3 km || 
|-id=466 bgcolor=#E9E9E9
| 612466 ||  || — || September 11, 2002 || Palomar || NEAT ||  || align=right | 1.5 km || 
|-id=467 bgcolor=#E9E9E9
| 612467 ||  || — || September 4, 2002 || Palomar || NEAT ||  || align=right | 1.1 km || 
|-id=468 bgcolor=#E9E9E9
| 612468 ||  || — || September 4, 2002 || Palomar || NEAT ||  || align=right | 1.2 km || 
|-id=469 bgcolor=#d6d6d6
| 612469 ||  || — || September 10, 2002 || Palomar || NEAT ||  || align=right | 2.4 km || 
|-id=470 bgcolor=#E9E9E9
| 612470 ||  || — || September 16, 2002 || Palomar || NEAT ||  || align=right | 2.7 km || 
|-id=471 bgcolor=#fefefe
| 612471 ||  || — || September 18, 2002 || Palomar || NEAT || PHO || align=right data-sort-value="0.89" | 890 m || 
|-id=472 bgcolor=#FFC2E0
| 612472 ||  || — || September 21, 2002 || Palomar || NEAT || APO || align=right data-sort-value="0.37" | 370 m || 
|-id=473 bgcolor=#E9E9E9
| 612473 ||  || — || September 27, 2002 || Palomar || NEAT ||  || align=right data-sort-value="0.76" | 760 m || 
|-id=474 bgcolor=#E9E9E9
| 612474 ||  || — || September 26, 2002 || Palomar || NEAT ||  || align=right data-sort-value="0.83" | 830 m || 
|-id=475 bgcolor=#E9E9E9
| 612475 ||  || — || September 30, 2002 || Socorro || LINEAR ||  || align=right data-sort-value="0.95" | 950 m || 
|-id=476 bgcolor=#d6d6d6
| 612476 ||  || — || September 28, 2002 || Palomar || NEAT || EUP || align=right | 3.2 km || 
|-id=477 bgcolor=#d6d6d6
| 612477 ||  || — || September 26, 2002 || Palomar || NEAT || THM || align=right | 1.9 km || 
|-id=478 bgcolor=#E9E9E9
| 612478 ||  || — || October 2, 2002 || Socorro || LINEAR ||  || align=right data-sort-value="0.70" | 700 m || 
|-id=479 bgcolor=#fefefe
| 612479 ||  || — || October 2, 2002 || Socorro || LINEAR ||  || align=right data-sort-value="0.57" | 570 m || 
|-id=480 bgcolor=#d6d6d6
| 612480 ||  || — || October 2, 2002 || Socorro || LINEAR ||  || align=right | 3.0 km || 
|-id=481 bgcolor=#FA8072
| 612481 ||  || — || October 2, 2002 || Socorro || LINEAR ||  || align=right | 1.0 km || 
|-id=482 bgcolor=#fefefe
| 612482 ||  || — || October 2, 2002 || Haleakala || NEAT ||  || align=right data-sort-value="0.67" | 670 m || 
|-id=483 bgcolor=#E9E9E9
| 612483 ||  || — || October 3, 2002 || Socorro || LINEAR ||  || align=right data-sort-value="0.96" | 960 m || 
|-id=484 bgcolor=#FFC2E0
| 612484 ||  || — || October 7, 2002 || Palomar || NEAT || AMO || align=right data-sort-value="0.53" | 530 m || 
|-id=485 bgcolor=#FA8072
| 612485 ||  || — || October 8, 2002 || Palomar || NEAT ||  || align=right data-sort-value="0.45" | 450 m || 
|-id=486 bgcolor=#FA8072
| 612486 ||  || — || October 1, 2002 || Anderson Mesa || LONEOS ||  || align=right data-sort-value="0.48" | 480 m || 
|-id=487 bgcolor=#d6d6d6
| 612487 ||  || — || October 3, 2002 || Socorro || LINEAR ||  || align=right | 1.6 km || 
|-id=488 bgcolor=#fefefe
| 612488 ||  || — || October 5, 2002 || Palomar || NEAT ||  || align=right data-sort-value="0.64" | 640 m || 
|-id=489 bgcolor=#FA8072
| 612489 ||  || — || October 13, 2002 || Palomar || NEAT || H || align=right data-sort-value="0.60" | 600 m || 
|-id=490 bgcolor=#E9E9E9
| 612490 ||  || — || October 5, 2002 || Socorro || LINEAR ||  || align=right | 1.8 km || 
|-id=491 bgcolor=#d6d6d6
| 612491 ||  || — || October 9, 2002 || Kitt Peak || Spacewatch || THM || align=right | 1.8 km || 
|-id=492 bgcolor=#d6d6d6
| 612492 ||  || — || October 6, 2002 || Socorro || LINEAR ||  || align=right | 2.7 km || 
|-id=493 bgcolor=#fefefe
| 612493 ||  || — || October 10, 2002 || Palomar || NEAT ||  || align=right data-sort-value="0.81" | 810 m || 
|-id=494 bgcolor=#E9E9E9
| 612494 ||  || — || October 10, 2002 || Socorro || LINEAR ||  || align=right | 1.5 km || 
|-id=495 bgcolor=#d6d6d6
| 612495 ||  || — || October 4, 2002 || Apache Point || SDSS ||  || align=right | 2.4 km || 
|-id=496 bgcolor=#d6d6d6
| 612496 ||  || — || October 5, 2002 || Apache Point || SDSS ||  || align=right | 2.1 km || 
|-id=497 bgcolor=#fefefe
| 612497 ||  || — || October 5, 2002 || Apache Point || SDSS ||  || align=right data-sort-value="0.50" | 500 m || 
|-id=498 bgcolor=#fefefe
| 612498 ||  || — || October 5, 2002 || Apache Point || SDSS ||  || align=right data-sort-value="0.54" | 540 m || 
|-id=499 bgcolor=#fefefe
| 612499 ||  || — || October 5, 2002 || Apache Point || SDSS ||  || align=right data-sort-value="0.59" | 590 m || 
|-id=500 bgcolor=#fefefe
| 612500 ||  || — || October 5, 2002 || Apache Point || SDSS ||  || align=right data-sort-value="0.63" | 630 m || 
|}

612501–612600 

|-bgcolor=#E9E9E9
| 612501 ||  || — || October 5, 2002 || Apache Point || SDSS ||  || align=right | 1.7 km || 
|-id=502 bgcolor=#E9E9E9
| 612502 ||  || — || October 10, 2002 || Apache Point || SDSS ||  || align=right | 1.3 km || 
|-id=503 bgcolor=#fefefe
| 612503 ||  || — || October 10, 2002 || Apache Point || SDSS ||  || align=right data-sort-value="0.50" | 500 m || 
|-id=504 bgcolor=#fefefe
| 612504 ||  || — || October 5, 2002 || Palomar || NEAT ||  || align=right data-sort-value="0.45" | 450 m || 
|-id=505 bgcolor=#d6d6d6
| 612505 ||  || — || October 9, 2002 || Palomar || NEAT ||  || align=right | 2.1 km || 
|-id=506 bgcolor=#E9E9E9
| 612506 ||  || — || October 15, 2002 || Palomar || NEAT ||  || align=right | 1.1 km || 
|-id=507 bgcolor=#fefefe
| 612507 ||  || — || October 4, 2002 || Apache Point || SDSS ||  || align=right data-sort-value="0.57" | 570 m || 
|-id=508 bgcolor=#fefefe
| 612508 ||  || — || October 15, 2002 || Palomar || NEAT ||  || align=right data-sort-value="0.64" | 640 m || 
|-id=509 bgcolor=#FFC2E0
| 612509 ||  || — || October 29, 2002 || Palomar || NEAT || APOPHA || align=right data-sort-value="0.15" | 150 m || 
|-id=510 bgcolor=#FA8072
| 612510 ||  || — || October 28, 2002 || Haleakala || NEAT ||  || align=right data-sort-value="0.95" | 950 m || 
|-id=511 bgcolor=#fefefe
| 612511 ||  || — || October 30, 2002 || Kitt Peak || Spacewatch ||  || align=right data-sort-value="0.52" | 520 m || 
|-id=512 bgcolor=#fefefe
| 612512 ||  || — || October 29, 2002 || Apache Point || SDSS ||  || align=right data-sort-value="0.72" | 720 m || 
|-id=513 bgcolor=#fefefe
| 612513 ||  || — || October 29, 2002 || Apache Point || SDSS ||  || align=right data-sort-value="0.69" | 690 m || 
|-id=514 bgcolor=#E9E9E9
| 612514 ||  || — || October 29, 2002 || Apache Point || SDSS ||  || align=right data-sort-value="0.70" | 700 m || 
|-id=515 bgcolor=#d6d6d6
| 612515 ||  || — || October 29, 2002 || Apache Point || SDSS ||  || align=right | 1.9 km || 
|-id=516 bgcolor=#d6d6d6
| 612516 ||  || — || October 30, 2002 || Apache Point || SDSS || EUP || align=right | 3.5 km || 
|-id=517 bgcolor=#d6d6d6
| 612517 ||  || — || October 29, 2002 || Palomar || NEAT ||  || align=right | 2.3 km || 
|-id=518 bgcolor=#fefefe
| 612518 ||  || — || October 29, 2002 || Palomar || NEAT ||  || align=right data-sort-value="0.57" | 570 m || 
|-id=519 bgcolor=#fefefe
| 612519 ||  || — || October 31, 2002 || Palomar || NEAT ||  || align=right data-sort-value="0.55" | 550 m || 
|-id=520 bgcolor=#fefefe
| 612520 ||  || — || November 6, 2002 || Anderson Mesa || LONEOS ||  || align=right data-sort-value="0.70" | 700 m || 
|-id=521 bgcolor=#fefefe
| 612521 ||  || — || November 6, 2002 || Haleakala || NEAT ||  || align=right data-sort-value="0.57" | 570 m || 
|-id=522 bgcolor=#FFC2E0
| 612522 ||  || — || November 11, 2002 || Socorro || LINEAR || APO +1kmPHA || align=right data-sort-value="0.81" | 810 m || 
|-id=523 bgcolor=#E9E9E9
| 612523 ||  || — || November 12, 2002 || Socorro || LINEAR ||  || align=right | 1.1 km || 
|-id=524 bgcolor=#C2E0FF
| 612524 ||  || — || November 7, 2002 || Kitt Peak || M. W. Buie || twotinocritical || align=right | 152 km || 
|-id=525 bgcolor=#fefefe
| 612525 ||  || — || November 14, 2002 || Palomar || NEAT ||  || align=right data-sort-value="0.59" | 590 m || 
|-id=526 bgcolor=#fefefe
| 612526 ||  || — || November 5, 2002 || Palomar || NEAT ||  || align=right data-sort-value="0.60" | 600 m || 
|-id=527 bgcolor=#E9E9E9
| 612527 ||  || — || November 27, 2002 || Anderson Mesa || LONEOS ||  || align=right | 1.0 km || 
|-id=528 bgcolor=#d6d6d6
| 612528 ||  || — || November 24, 2002 || Palomar || NEAT ||  || align=right | 1.7 km || 
|-id=529 bgcolor=#FFC2E0
| 612529 ||  || — || December 11, 2002 || Socorro || LINEAR || AMO || align=right data-sort-value="0.36" | 360 m || 
|-id=530 bgcolor=#d6d6d6
| 612530 ||  || — || December 10, 2002 || Socorro || LINEAR || Tj (2.93) || align=right | 3.0 km || 
|-id=531 bgcolor=#FA8072
| 612531 ||  || — || December 11, 2002 || Socorro || LINEAR ||  || align=right data-sort-value="0.66" | 660 m || 
|-id=532 bgcolor=#d6d6d6
| 612532 ||  || — || December 9, 2002 || Mount Graham || W. H. Ryan, L. Stewart || EOS || align=right | 2.0 km || 
|-id=533 bgcolor=#C2E0FF
| 612533 ||  || — || December 10, 2002 || Palomar || Palomar Obs. || plutinocritical || align=right | 466 km || 
|-id=534 bgcolor=#fefefe
| 612534 ||  || — || December 31, 2002 || Socorro || LINEAR ||  || align=right data-sort-value="0.78" | 780 m || 
|-id=535 bgcolor=#d6d6d6
| 612535 ||  || — || December 27, 2002 || Palomar || NEAT ||  || align=right | 3.4 km || 
|-id=536 bgcolor=#FFC2E0
| 612536 ||  || — || January 3, 2003 || Socorro || LINEAR || APOPHA || align=right data-sort-value="0.31" | 310 m || 
|-id=537 bgcolor=#E9E9E9
| 612537 ||  || — || January 10, 2003 || Kitt Peak || Spacewatch ||  || align=right data-sort-value="0.90" | 900 m || 
|-id=538 bgcolor=#E9E9E9
| 612538 ||  || — || January 4, 2003 || Kitt Peak || DLS || (1547) || align=right data-sort-value="0.98" | 980 m || 
|-id=539 bgcolor=#FA8072
| 612539 ||  || — || January 23, 2003 || Socorro || LINEAR ||  || align=right | 1.4 km || 
|-id=540 bgcolor=#FA8072
| 612540 ||  || — || January 27, 2003 || Socorro || LINEAR ||  || align=right data-sort-value="0.73" | 730 m || 
|-id=541 bgcolor=#FFC2E0
| 612541 ||  || — || February 28, 2003 || Socorro || LINEAR || APO +1km || align=right data-sort-value="0.90" | 900 m || 
|-id=542 bgcolor=#FA8072
| 612542 ||  || — || March 23, 2003 || Eskridge || G. Hug || Tj (2.9) || align=right | 2.7 km || 
|-id=543 bgcolor=#FA8072
| 612543 ||  || — || April 22, 2003 || Socorro || LINEAR || Tj (2.99) || align=right | 2.1 km || 
|-id=544 bgcolor=#fefefe
| 612544 ||  || — || April 24, 2003 || Kitt Peak || Spacewatch ||  || align=right data-sort-value="0.59" | 590 m || 
|-id=545 bgcolor=#fefefe
| 612545 ||  || — || April 25, 2003 || Kitt Peak || Spacewatch ||  || align=right data-sort-value="0.67" | 670 m || 
|-id=546 bgcolor=#d6d6d6
| 612546 ||  || — || April 29, 2003 || Kitt Peak || Spacewatch || Tj (2.96) || align=right | 3.9 km || 
|-id=547 bgcolor=#C2E0FF
| 612547 ||  || — || April 26, 2003 || Mauna Kea || Mauna Kea Obs. || plutinocritical || align=right | 121 km || 
|-id=548 bgcolor=#C2E0FF
| 612548 ||  || — || April 26, 2003 || Mauna Kea || Mauna Kea Obs. || cubewano (hot)critical || align=right | 150 km || 
|-id=549 bgcolor=#C2E0FF
| 612549 ||  || — || April 26, 2003 || Mauna Kea || Mauna Kea Obs. || cubewano (cold)mooncritical || align=right | 224 km || 
|-id=550 bgcolor=#FA8072
| 612550 ||  || — || May 1, 2003 || Kitt Peak || Spacewatch ||  || align=right data-sort-value="0.61" | 610 m || 
|-id=551 bgcolor=#E9E9E9
| 612551 ||  || — || May 23, 2003 || Kitt Peak || Spacewatch || EUN || align=right data-sort-value="0.96" | 960 m || 
|-id=552 bgcolor=#FFC2E0
| 612552 ||  || — || May 29, 2003 || Socorro || LINEAR || AMO || align=right data-sort-value="0.32" | 320 m || 
|-id=553 bgcolor=#FA8072
| 612553 ||  || — || June 26, 2003 || Socorro || LINEAR ||  || align=right | 1.3 km || 
|-id=554 bgcolor=#d6d6d6
| 612554 ||  || — || July 4, 2003 || Kitt Peak || Spacewatch ||  || align=right | 3.1 km || 
|-id=555 bgcolor=#fefefe
| 612555 ||  || — || July 4, 2003 || Kitt Peak || Spacewatch ||  || align=right | 1.5 km || 
|-id=556 bgcolor=#FFC2E0
| 612556 ||  || — || July 20, 2003 || Palomar || NEAT || AMO || align=right data-sort-value="0.42" | 420 m || 
|-id=557 bgcolor=#fefefe
| 612557 ||  || — || July 23, 2003 || Palomar || NEAT ||  || align=right | 1.5 km || 
|-id=558 bgcolor=#FA8072
| 612558 ||  || — || July 23, 2003 || Palomar || NEAT ||  || align=right data-sort-value="0.70" | 700 m || 
|-id=559 bgcolor=#FA8072
| 612559 ||  || — || July 24, 2003 || Palomar || NEAT ||  || align=right data-sort-value="0.46" | 460 m || 
|-id=560 bgcolor=#FA8072
| 612560 ||  || — || July 30, 2003 || Socorro || LINEAR ||  || align=right data-sort-value="0.48" | 480 m || 
|-id=561 bgcolor=#fefefe
| 612561 ||  || — || August 2, 2003 || Klet || J. Tichá, M. Tichý ||  || align=right data-sort-value="0.64" | 640 m || 
|-id=562 bgcolor=#FA8072
| 612562 ||  || — || August 5, 2003 || Socorro || LINEAR ||  || align=right data-sort-value="0.46" | 460 m || 
|-id=563 bgcolor=#FFC2E0
| 612563 ||  || — || August 16, 2003 || Costitx || OAM Obs. || APO || align=right data-sort-value="0.71" | 710 m || 
|-id=564 bgcolor=#E9E9E9
| 612564 ||  || — || August 22, 2003 || Palomar || NEAT ||  || align=right | 1.9 km || 
|-id=565 bgcolor=#E9E9E9
| 612565 ||  || — || August 23, 2003 || Palomar || NEAT ||  || align=right data-sort-value="0.68" | 680 m || 
|-id=566 bgcolor=#E9E9E9
| 612566 ||  || — || August 21, 2003 || Campo Imperatore || CINEOS ||  || align=right data-sort-value="0.95" | 950 m || 
|-id=567 bgcolor=#E9E9E9
| 612567 ||  || — || August 22, 2003 || Palomar || NEAT ||  || align=right data-sort-value="0.83" | 830 m || 
|-id=568 bgcolor=#d6d6d6
| 612568 ||  || — || August 22, 2003 || Palomar || NEAT ||  || align=right | 2.4 km || 
|-id=569 bgcolor=#E9E9E9
| 612569 ||  || — || August 23, 2003 || Socorro || LINEAR ||  || align=right data-sort-value="0.94" | 940 m || 
|-id=570 bgcolor=#FA8072
| 612570 ||  || — || August 25, 2003 || Socorro || LINEAR ||  || align=right data-sort-value="0.68" | 680 m || 
|-id=571 bgcolor=#fefefe
| 612571 ||  || — || August 24, 2003 || Socorro || LINEAR ||  || align=right | 1.6 km || 
|-id=572 bgcolor=#fefefe
| 612572 ||  || — || August 28, 2003 || Cerro Tololo || I. P. Griffin ||  || align=right data-sort-value="0.66" | 660 m || 
|-id=573 bgcolor=#C2E0FF
| 612573 ||  || — || August 23, 2003 || Cerro Tololo || M. W. Buie || cubewano (cold)critical || align=right | 168 km || 
|-id=574 bgcolor=#C2E0FF
| 612574 ||  || — || August 24, 2003 || Cerro Tololo || M. W. Buie || plutinocritical || align=right | 198 km || 
|-id=575 bgcolor=#C2E0FF
| 612575 ||  || — || August 25, 2003 || Cerro Tololo || M. W. Buie || SDOcritical || align=right | 159 km || 
|-id=576 bgcolor=#C2E0FF
| 612576 ||  || — || August 23, 2003 || Cerro Tololo || M. W. Buie || cubewano (hot)critical || align=right | 167 km || 
|-id=577 bgcolor=#C2E0FF
| 612577 ||  || — || August 23, 2003 || Cerro Tololo || M. W. Buie || cubewano (hot)critical || align=right | 123 km || 
|-id=578 bgcolor=#C2E0FF
| 612578 ||  || — || August 24, 2003 || Cerro Tololo || M. W. Buie || other TNOmoon || align=right | 206 km || 
|-id=579 bgcolor=#C2E0FF
| 612579 ||  || — || August 25, 2003 || Cerro Tololo || M. W. Buie || cubewano (cold)critical || align=right | 160 km || 
|-id=580 bgcolor=#C2E0FF
| 612580 ||  || — || August 24, 2003 || Cerro Tololo || M. W. Buie || other TNOcritical || align=right | 196 km || 
|-id=581 bgcolor=#C2E0FF
| 612581 ||  || — || August 25, 2003 || Cerro Tololo || M. W. Buie || plutino || align=right | 178 km || 
|-id=582 bgcolor=#C2E0FF
| 612582 ||  || — || August 25, 2003 || Cerro Tololo || M. W. Buie || cubewano (cold)critical || align=right | 166 km || 
|-id=583 bgcolor=#C2E0FF
| 612583 ||  || — || August 26, 2003 || Cerro Tololo || M. W. Buie || cubewano (cold)critical || align=right | 163 km || 
|-id=584 bgcolor=#C2E0FF
| 612584 ||  || — || August 31, 2003 || Mauna Kea || Mauna Kea Obs. || SDOcritical || align=right | 435 km || 
|-id=585 bgcolor=#fefefe
| 612585 ||  || — || September 1, 2003 || Socorro || LINEAR ||  || align=right data-sort-value="0.58" | 580 m || 
|-id=586 bgcolor=#E9E9E9
| 612586 ||  || — || September 4, 2003 || Campo Imperatore || CINEOS ||  || align=right data-sort-value="0.78" | 780 m || 
|-id=587 bgcolor=#FA8072
| 612587 ||  || — || September 7, 2003 || Socorro || LINEAR ||  || align=right data-sort-value="0.91" | 910 m || 
|-id=588 bgcolor=#d6d6d6
| 612588 ||  || — || September 4, 2003 || Socorro || LINEAR ||  || align=right | 3.1 km || 
|-id=589 bgcolor=#FFC2E0
| 612589 ||  || — || September 14, 2003 || Anderson Mesa || LONEOS || AMO || align=right data-sort-value="0.49" | 490 m || 
|-id=590 bgcolor=#fefefe
| 612590 ||  || — || September 16, 2003 || Kitt Peak || Spacewatch ||  || align=right data-sort-value="0.71" | 710 m || 
|-id=591 bgcolor=#d6d6d6
| 612591 ||  || — || September 16, 2003 || Palomar || NEAT ||  || align=right | 1.8 km || 
|-id=592 bgcolor=#fefefe
| 612592 ||  || — || September 17, 2003 || Kitt Peak || Spacewatch ||  || align=right data-sort-value="0.63" | 630 m || 
|-id=593 bgcolor=#FFC2E0
| 612593 ||  || — || September 18, 2003 || Socorro || LINEAR || APO || align=right data-sort-value="0.56" | 560 m || 
|-id=594 bgcolor=#fefefe
| 612594 ||  || — || September 19, 2003 || Palomar || NEAT ||  || align=right data-sort-value="0.64" | 640 m || 
|-id=595 bgcolor=#E9E9E9
| 612595 ||  || — || September 17, 2003 || Anderson Mesa || LONEOS ||  || align=right | 1.0 km || 
|-id=596 bgcolor=#fefefe
| 612596 ||  || — || September 18, 2003 || Kitt Peak || Spacewatch ||  || align=right data-sort-value="0.39" | 390 m || 
|-id=597 bgcolor=#d6d6d6
| 612597 ||  || — || September 18, 2003 || Kitt Peak || Spacewatch ||  || align=right | 2.5 km || 
|-id=598 bgcolor=#E9E9E9
| 612598 ||  || — || September 18, 2003 || Palomar || NEAT ||  || align=right data-sort-value="0.91" | 910 m || 
|-id=599 bgcolor=#FA8072
| 612599 ||  || — || September 18, 2003 || Socorro || LINEAR ||  || align=right data-sort-value="0.54" | 540 m || 
|-id=600 bgcolor=#FFC2E0
| 612600 ||  || — || September 20, 2003 || Socorro || LINEAR || AMO || align=right data-sort-value="0.088" | 88 m || 
|}

612601–612700 

|-bgcolor=#fefefe
| 612601 ||  || — || September 19, 2003 || Kitt Peak || Spacewatch ||  || align=right data-sort-value="0.76" | 760 m || 
|-id=602 bgcolor=#E9E9E9
| 612602 ||  || — || September 20, 2003 || Socorro || LINEAR ||  || align=right | 1.2 km || 
|-id=603 bgcolor=#d6d6d6
| 612603 ||  || — || September 16, 2003 || Palomar || NEAT ||  || align=right | 2.2 km || 
|-id=604 bgcolor=#E9E9E9
| 612604 ||  || — || September 18, 2003 || Palomar || NEAT ||  || align=right | 1.3 km || 
|-id=605 bgcolor=#d6d6d6
| 612605 ||  || — || September 19, 2003 || Anderson Mesa || LONEOS ||  || align=right | 2.1 km || 
|-id=606 bgcolor=#fefefe
| 612606 ||  || — || September 22, 2003 || Kitt Peak || Spacewatch ||  || align=right data-sort-value="0.71" | 710 m || 
|-id=607 bgcolor=#E9E9E9
| 612607 ||  || — || September 17, 2003 || Kitt Peak || Spacewatch ||  || align=right | 1.4 km || 
|-id=608 bgcolor=#FFC2E0
| 612608 ||  || — || September 26, 2003 || Palomar || NEAT || AMO +1km || align=right data-sort-value="0.90" | 900 m || 
|-id=609 bgcolor=#E9E9E9
| 612609 ||  || — || September 23, 2003 || Palomar || NEAT ||  || align=right data-sort-value="0.87" | 870 m || 
|-id=610 bgcolor=#fefefe
| 612610 ||  || — || September 19, 2003 || Mount Graham || VATT || MAS || align=right data-sort-value="0.50" | 500 m || 
|-id=611 bgcolor=#d6d6d6
| 612611 ||  || — || September 27, 2003 || Kitt Peak || Spacewatch ||  || align=right | 1.8 km || 
|-id=612 bgcolor=#d6d6d6
| 612612 ||  || — || September 27, 2003 || Kitt Peak || Spacewatch || KOR || align=right | 1.7 km || 
|-id=613 bgcolor=#d6d6d6
| 612613 ||  || — || September 27, 2003 || Socorro || LINEAR || 7:4 || align=right | 2.0 km || 
|-id=614 bgcolor=#fefefe
| 612614 ||  || — || September 27, 2003 || Kitt Peak || Spacewatch ||  || align=right data-sort-value="0.76" | 760 m || 
|-id=615 bgcolor=#fefefe
| 612615 ||  || — || September 29, 2003 || Kitt Peak || Spacewatch ||  || align=right data-sort-value="0.55" | 550 m || 
|-id=616 bgcolor=#fefefe
| 612616 ||  || — || September 30, 2003 || Socorro || LINEAR ||  || align=right data-sort-value="0.69" | 690 m || 
|-id=617 bgcolor=#E9E9E9
| 612617 ||  || — || September 18, 2003 || Palomar || NEAT ||  || align=right | 1.1 km || 
|-id=618 bgcolor=#d6d6d6
| 612618 ||  || — || September 30, 2003 || Kitt Peak || Spacewatch ||  || align=right | 2.0 km || 
|-id=619 bgcolor=#C2E0FF
| 612619 ||  || — || September 25, 2003 || Mauna Kea || Mauna Kea Obs. || cubewano (cold)critical || align=right | 218 km || 
|-id=620 bgcolor=#C2E0FF
| 612620 ||  || — || September 25, 2003 || Mauna Kea || Mauna Kea Obs. || Haumea || align=right | 205 km || 
|-id=621 bgcolor=#C2E0FF
| 612621 ||  || — || September 25, 2003 || Mauna Kea || Mauna Kea Obs. || plutinocritical || align=right | 124 km || 
|-id=622 bgcolor=#E9E9E9
| 612622 ||  || — || September 16, 2003 || Kitt Peak || Spacewatch ||  || align=right | 1.2 km || 
|-id=623 bgcolor=#E9E9E9
| 612623 ||  || — || September 16, 2003 || Kitt Peak || Spacewatch ||  || align=right data-sort-value="0.89" | 890 m || 
|-id=624 bgcolor=#E9E9E9
| 612624 ||  || — || September 17, 2003 || Kitt Peak || Spacewatch ||  || align=right | 1.7 km || 
|-id=625 bgcolor=#E9E9E9
| 612625 ||  || — || September 17, 2003 || Kitt Peak || Spacewatch || KON || align=right data-sort-value="0.94" | 940 m || 
|-id=626 bgcolor=#E9E9E9
| 612626 ||  || — || September 21, 2003 || Kitt Peak || Spacewatch ||  || align=right data-sort-value="0.92" | 920 m || 
|-id=627 bgcolor=#d6d6d6
| 612627 ||  || — || September 26, 2003 || Apache Point || SDSS ||  || align=right | 2.1 km || 
|-id=628 bgcolor=#d6d6d6
| 612628 ||  || — || September 26, 2003 || Apache Point || SDSS ||  || align=right | 2.8 km || 
|-id=629 bgcolor=#d6d6d6
| 612629 ||  || — || September 27, 2003 || Apache Point || SDSS ||  || align=right | 2.3 km || 
|-id=630 bgcolor=#E9E9E9
| 612630 ||  || — || September 26, 2003 || Apache Point || SDSS ||  || align=right | 1.7 km || 
|-id=631 bgcolor=#fefefe
| 612631 ||  || — || September 16, 2003 || Kitt Peak || Spacewatch || NYS || align=right data-sort-value="0.67" | 670 m || 
|-id=632 bgcolor=#E9E9E9
| 612632 ||  || — || September 18, 2003 || Kitt Peak || Spacewatch ||  || align=right | 1.6 km || 
|-id=633 bgcolor=#E9E9E9
| 612633 ||  || — || September 22, 2003 || Palomar || NEAT ||  || align=right data-sort-value="0.59" | 590 m || 
|-id=634 bgcolor=#fefefe
| 612634 ||  || — || September 22, 2003 || Anderson Mesa || LONEOS ||  || align=right data-sort-value="0.64" | 640 m || 
|-id=635 bgcolor=#E9E9E9
| 612635 ||  || — || September 24, 2003 || Palomar || NEAT ||  || align=right data-sort-value="0.82" | 820 m || 
|-id=636 bgcolor=#E9E9E9
| 612636 ||  || — || September 20, 2003 || Kitt Peak || Spacewatch || HOF || align=right | 1.6 km || 
|-id=637 bgcolor=#E9E9E9
| 612637 ||  || — || September 20, 2003 || Kitt Peak || Spacewatch ||  || align=right data-sort-value="0.79" | 790 m || 
|-id=638 bgcolor=#d6d6d6
| 612638 ||  || — || September 21, 2003 || Kitt Peak || Spacewatch ||  || align=right | 1.8 km || 
|-id=639 bgcolor=#E9E9E9
| 612639 ||  || — || September 21, 2003 || Kitt Peak || Spacewatch ||  || align=right data-sort-value="0.51" | 510 m || 
|-id=640 bgcolor=#E9E9E9
| 612640 ||  || — || September 22, 2003 || Kitt Peak || Spacewatch ||  || align=right data-sort-value="0.65" | 650 m || 
|-id=641 bgcolor=#E9E9E9
| 612641 ||  || — || September 22, 2003 || Kitt Peak || Spacewatch ||  || align=right | 1.1 km || 
|-id=642 bgcolor=#E9E9E9
| 612642 ||  || — || September 26, 2003 || Apache Point || SDSS ||  || align=right | 1.5 km || 
|-id=643 bgcolor=#d6d6d6
| 612643 ||  || — || September 26, 2003 || Apache Point || SDSS ||  || align=right | 2.3 km || 
|-id=644 bgcolor=#d6d6d6
| 612644 ||  || — || September 26, 2003 || Apache Point || SDSS ||  || align=right | 2.1 km || 
|-id=645 bgcolor=#E9E9E9
| 612645 ||  || — || September 27, 2003 || Apache Point || SDSS ||  || align=right | 1.3 km || 
|-id=646 bgcolor=#fefefe
| 612646 ||  || — || September 17, 2003 || Kitt Peak || Spacewatch ||  || align=right data-sort-value="0.55" | 550 m || 
|-id=647 bgcolor=#fefefe
| 612647 ||  || — || September 16, 2003 || Kitt Peak || Spacewatch ||  || align=right data-sort-value="0.46" | 460 m || 
|-id=648 bgcolor=#fefefe
| 612648 ||  || — || September 21, 2003 || Anderson Mesa || LONEOS ||  || align=right data-sort-value="0.67" | 670 m || 
|-id=649 bgcolor=#fefefe
| 612649 ||  || — || September 28, 2003 || Kitt Peak || Spacewatch || NYS || align=right data-sort-value="0.48" | 480 m || 
|-id=650 bgcolor=#E9E9E9
| 612650 ||  || — || September 16, 2003 || Kitt Peak || Spacewatch ||  || align=right | 1.2 km || 
|-id=651 bgcolor=#d6d6d6
| 612651 ||  || — || September 16, 2003 || Kitt Peak || Spacewatch ||  || align=right | 1.5 km || 
|-id=652 bgcolor=#d6d6d6
| 612652 ||  || — || September 18, 2003 || Kitt Peak || Spacewatch ||  || align=right | 1.9 km || 
|-id=653 bgcolor=#d6d6d6
| 612653 ||  || — || September 18, 2003 || Kitt Peak || Spacewatch ||  || align=right | 2.0 km || 
|-id=654 bgcolor=#E9E9E9
| 612654 ||  || — || October 15, 2003 || Palomar || NEAT || EUN || align=right | 1.0 km || 
|-id=655 bgcolor=#E9E9E9
| 612655 ||  || — || October 1, 2003 || Kitt Peak || Spacewatch ||  || align=right data-sort-value="0.83" | 830 m || 
|-id=656 bgcolor=#d6d6d6
| 612656 ||  || — || October 2, 2003 || Kitt Peak || Spacewatch ||  || align=right | 1.8 km || 
|-id=657 bgcolor=#d6d6d6
| 612657 ||  || — || October 2, 2003 || Kitt Peak || Spacewatch || 7:4 || align=right | 2.0 km || 
|-id=658 bgcolor=#C2E0FF
| 612658 ||  || — || October 3, 2003 || Mauna Kea || Mauna Kea Obs. || plutinocritical || align=right | 156 km || 
|-id=659 bgcolor=#d6d6d6
| 612659 ||  || — || October 5, 2003 || Kitt Peak || Spacewatch ||  || align=right | 1.8 km || 
|-id=660 bgcolor=#E9E9E9
| 612660 ||  || — || October 16, 2003 || Palomar || NEAT ||  || align=right data-sort-value="0.91" | 910 m || 
|-id=661 bgcolor=#FA8072
| 612661 ||  || — || October 16, 2003 || Kitt Peak || Spacewatch ||  || align=right data-sort-value="0.44" | 440 m || 
|-id=662 bgcolor=#fefefe
| 612662 ||  || — || October 19, 2003 || Kitt Peak || Spacewatch ||  || align=right data-sort-value="0.50" | 500 m || 
|-id=663 bgcolor=#fefefe
| 612663 ||  || — || October 16, 2003 || Kitt Peak || Spacewatch ||  || align=right data-sort-value="0.61" | 610 m || 
|-id=664 bgcolor=#d6d6d6
| 612664 ||  || — || October 17, 2003 || Kitt Peak || Spacewatch ||  || align=right | 1.9 km || 
|-id=665 bgcolor=#FA8072
| 612665 ||  || — || October 16, 2003 || Palomar || NEAT ||  || align=right data-sort-value="0.56" | 560 m || 
|-id=666 bgcolor=#d6d6d6
| 612666 ||  || — || October 18, 2003 || Palomar || NEAT ||  || align=right | 2.2 km || 
|-id=667 bgcolor=#fefefe
| 612667 ||  || — || October 26, 2003 || Uppsala-Kvistaberg || UDAS || NYS || align=right data-sort-value="0.83" | 830 m || 
|-id=668 bgcolor=#fefefe
| 612668 ||  || — || October 18, 2003 || Kitt Peak || Spacewatch || NYS || align=right data-sort-value="0.57" | 570 m || 
|-id=669 bgcolor=#fefefe
| 612669 ||  || — || October 17, 2003 || Kitt Peak || Spacewatch ||  || align=right data-sort-value="0.75" | 750 m || 
|-id=670 bgcolor=#E9E9E9
| 612670 ||  || — || October 17, 2003 || Anderson Mesa || LONEOS ||  || align=right | 1.6 km || 
|-id=671 bgcolor=#fefefe
| 612671 ||  || — || October 18, 2003 || Kitt Peak || Spacewatch ||  || align=right data-sort-value="0.65" | 650 m || 
|-id=672 bgcolor=#d6d6d6
| 612672 ||  || — || October 21, 2003 || Kitt Peak || Spacewatch ||  || align=right | 1.8 km || 
|-id=673 bgcolor=#d6d6d6
| 612673 ||  || — || October 21, 2003 || Socorro || LINEAR ||  || align=right | 2.8 km || 
|-id=674 bgcolor=#fefefe
| 612674 ||  || — || October 21, 2003 || Kitt Peak || Spacewatch ||  || align=right data-sort-value="0.71" | 710 m || 
|-id=675 bgcolor=#fefefe
| 612675 ||  || — || October 21, 2003 || Palomar || NEAT ||  || align=right data-sort-value="0.60" | 600 m || 
|-id=676 bgcolor=#d6d6d6
| 612676 ||  || — || October 21, 2003 || Palomar || NEAT ||  || align=right | 2.1 km || 
|-id=677 bgcolor=#E9E9E9
| 612677 ||  || — || October 22, 2003 || Kitt Peak || Spacewatch ||  || align=right | 1.1 km || 
|-id=678 bgcolor=#fefefe
| 612678 ||  || — || October 23, 2003 || Anderson Mesa || LONEOS ||  || align=right data-sort-value="0.89" | 890 m || 
|-id=679 bgcolor=#fefefe
| 612679 ||  || — || October 22, 2003 || Haleakala || NEAT || MAS || align=right data-sort-value="0.87" | 870 m || 
|-id=680 bgcolor=#fefefe
| 612680 ||  || — || October 23, 2003 || Kitt Peak || Spacewatch ||  || align=right data-sort-value="0.86" | 860 m || 
|-id=681 bgcolor=#E9E9E9
| 612681 ||  || — || October 24, 2003 || Socorro || LINEAR ||  || align=right | 1.1 km || 
|-id=682 bgcolor=#E9E9E9
| 612682 ||  || — || October 24, 2003 || Kitt Peak || Spacewatch ||  || align=right data-sort-value="0.48" | 480 m || 
|-id=683 bgcolor=#d6d6d6
| 612683 ||  || — || October 22, 2003 || Kitt Peak || Spacewatch || LIX || align=right | 2.4 km || 
|-id=684 bgcolor=#d6d6d6
| 612684 ||  || — || October 25, 2003 || Kitt Peak || Spacewatch ||  || align=right | 2.1 km || 
|-id=685 bgcolor=#fefefe
| 612685 ||  || — || October 25, 2003 || Kitt Peak || Spacewatch ||  || align=right data-sort-value="0.55" | 550 m || 
|-id=686 bgcolor=#d6d6d6
| 612686 ||  || — || October 29, 2003 || Socorro || LINEAR || Tj (2.98) || align=right | 2.1 km || 
|-id=687 bgcolor=#C2E0FF
| 612687 ||  || — || October 24, 2003 || Kitt Peak || M. W. Buie || cubewano (cold)mooncritical || align=right | 143 km || 
|-id=688 bgcolor=#C2E0FF
| 612688 ||  || — || October 24, 2003 || Kitt Peak || M. W. Buie || plutinocritical || align=right | 170 km || 
|-id=689 bgcolor=#E9E9E9
| 612689 ||  || — || October 16, 2003 || Kitt Peak || Spacewatch ||  || align=right | 1.4 km || 
|-id=690 bgcolor=#E9E9E9
| 612690 ||  || — || October 23, 2003 || Apache Point || SDSS ||  || align=right | 1.1 km || 
|-id=691 bgcolor=#d6d6d6
| 612691 ||  || — || October 17, 2003 || Apache Point || SDSS ||  || align=right | 2.6 km || 
|-id=692 bgcolor=#d6d6d6
| 612692 ||  || — || October 17, 2003 || Apache Point || SDSS ||  || align=right | 1.9 km || 
|-id=693 bgcolor=#d6d6d6
| 612693 ||  || — || October 17, 2003 || Apache Point || SDSS ||  || align=right | 2.0 km || 
|-id=694 bgcolor=#fefefe
| 612694 ||  || — || October 18, 2003 || Apache Point || SDSS ||  || align=right data-sort-value="0.46" | 460 m || 
|-id=695 bgcolor=#fefefe
| 612695 ||  || — || October 18, 2003 || Apache Point || SDSS ||  || align=right data-sort-value="0.68" | 680 m || 
|-id=696 bgcolor=#d6d6d6
| 612696 ||  || — || October 18, 2003 || Apache Point || SDSS ||  || align=right | 1.6 km || 
|-id=697 bgcolor=#E9E9E9
| 612697 ||  || — || October 18, 2003 || Apache Point || SDSS ||  || align=right | 1.1 km || 
|-id=698 bgcolor=#d6d6d6
| 612698 ||  || — || October 19, 2003 || Apache Point || SDSS ||  || align=right | 2.1 km || 
|-id=699 bgcolor=#d6d6d6
| 612699 ||  || — || October 19, 2003 || Apache Point || SDSS ||  || align=right | 2.0 km || 
|-id=700 bgcolor=#fefefe
| 612700 ||  || — || October 19, 2003 || Kitt Peak || Spacewatch ||  || align=right data-sort-value="0.68" | 680 m || 
|}

612701–612800 

|-bgcolor=#fefefe
| 612701 ||  || — || October 22, 2003 || Apache Point || SDSS ||  || align=right data-sort-value="0.51" | 510 m || 
|-id=702 bgcolor=#E9E9E9
| 612702 ||  || — || October 22, 2003 || Apache Point || SDSS || AGN || align=right | 1.4 km || 
|-id=703 bgcolor=#d6d6d6
| 612703 ||  || — || October 22, 2003 || Apache Point || SDSS ||  || align=right | 2.4 km || 
|-id=704 bgcolor=#FA8072
| 612704 ||  || — || November 14, 2003 || Palomar || NEAT || Tj (2.89) || align=right | 2.9 km || 
|-id=705 bgcolor=#fefefe
| 612705 ||  || — || November 15, 2003 || Kitt Peak || Spacewatch ||  || align=right data-sort-value="0.52" | 520 m || 
|-id=706 bgcolor=#E9E9E9
| 612706 ||  || — || November 18, 2003 || Catalina || CSS ||  || align=right data-sort-value="0.88" | 880 m || 
|-id=707 bgcolor=#E9E9E9
| 612707 ||  || — || November 16, 2003 || Kitt Peak || Spacewatch ||  || align=right | 1.1 km || 
|-id=708 bgcolor=#fefefe
| 612708 ||  || — || November 16, 2003 || Kitt Peak || Spacewatch || ERI || align=right data-sort-value="0.52" | 520 m || 
|-id=709 bgcolor=#d6d6d6
| 612709 ||  || — || November 19, 2003 || Kitt Peak || Spacewatch ||  || align=right | 2.0 km || 
|-id=710 bgcolor=#E9E9E9
| 612710 ||  || — || November 18, 2003 || Kitt Peak || Spacewatch ||  || align=right data-sort-value="0.62" | 620 m || 
|-id=711 bgcolor=#E9E9E9
| 612711 ||  || — || November 18, 2003 || Kitt Peak || Spacewatch ||  || align=right | 1.00 km || 
|-id=712 bgcolor=#E9E9E9
| 612712 ||  || — || November 19, 2003 || Socorro || LINEAR || (194) || align=right | 2.1 km || 
|-id=713 bgcolor=#E9E9E9
| 612713 ||  || — || November 22, 2003 || Kitt Peak || Spacewatch ||  || align=right data-sort-value="0.65" | 650 m || 
|-id=714 bgcolor=#d6d6d6
| 612714 ||  || — || November 21, 2003 || Socorro || LINEAR || Tj (2.98) || align=right | 3.1 km || 
|-id=715 bgcolor=#E9E9E9
| 612715 ||  || — || November 21, 2003 || Socorro || LINEAR || BAR || align=right | 1.8 km || 
|-id=716 bgcolor=#E9E9E9
| 612716 ||  || — || November 21, 2003 || Socorro || LINEAR ||  || align=right data-sort-value="0.68" | 680 m || 
|-id=717 bgcolor=#E9E9E9
| 612717 ||  || — || November 20, 2003 || Socorro || LINEAR ||  || align=right data-sort-value="0.97" | 970 m || 
|-id=718 bgcolor=#E9E9E9
| 612718 ||  || — || November 21, 2003 || Palomar || NEAT ||  || align=right | 1.3 km || 
|-id=719 bgcolor=#C2E0FF
| 612719 ||  || — || November 24, 2003 || Kitt Peak || M. W. Buie || cubewano (cold)mooncritical || align=right | 236 km || 
|-id=720 bgcolor=#FA8072
| 612720 ||  || — || December 14, 2003 || Kitt Peak || Spacewatch ||  || align=right | 3.4 km || 
|-id=721 bgcolor=#FA8072
| 612721 ||  || — || December 3, 2003 || Socorro || LINEAR ||  || align=right | 1.5 km || 
|-id=722 bgcolor=#d6d6d6
| 612722 ||  || — || December 1, 2003 || Kitt Peak || Spacewatch ||  || align=right | 2.2 km || 
|-id=723 bgcolor=#FFC2E0
| 612723 ||  || — || December 20, 2003 || Socorro || LINEAR || AMO || align=right data-sort-value="0.54" | 540 m || 
|-id=724 bgcolor=#d6d6d6
| 612724 ||  || — || December 18, 2003 || Socorro || LINEAR || Tj (2.93) || align=right | 3.5 km || 
|-id=725 bgcolor=#E9E9E9
| 612725 ||  || — || December 19, 2003 || Socorro || LINEAR || (1547) || align=right | 1.4 km || 
|-id=726 bgcolor=#d6d6d6
| 612726 ||  || — || December 27, 2003 || Socorro || LINEAR ||  || align=right | 1.2 km || 
|-id=727 bgcolor=#E9E9E9
| 612727 ||  || — || December 27, 2003 || Socorro || LINEAR ||  || align=right | 1.1 km || 
|-id=728 bgcolor=#d6d6d6
| 612728 ||  || — || December 28, 2003 || Socorro || LINEAR ||  || align=right | 3.4 km || 
|-id=729 bgcolor=#E9E9E9
| 612729 ||  || — || December 29, 2003 || Socorro || LINEAR ||  || align=right | 1.2 km || 
|-id=730 bgcolor=#d6d6d6
| 612730 ||  || — || December 16, 2003 || Kitt Peak || Spacewatch ||  || align=right | 1.8 km || 
|-id=731 bgcolor=#d6d6d6
| 612731 ||  || — || December 17, 2003 || Socorro || LINEAR || EUP || align=right | 3.7 km || 
|-id=732 bgcolor=#C2E0FF
| 612732 ||  || — || December 24, 2003 || Mauna Kea || Mauna Kea Obs. || SDO || align=right | 171 km || 
|-id=733 bgcolor=#C2E0FF
| 612733 ||  || — || December 24, 2003 || Mauna Kea || Mauna Kea Obs. || cubewano (cold)mooncritical || align=right | 182 km || 
|-id=734 bgcolor=#d6d6d6
| 612734 ||  || — || December 21, 2003 || Apache Point || SDSS ||  || align=right | 3.4 km || 
|-id=735 bgcolor=#d6d6d6
| 612735 ||  || — || January 13, 2004 || Mount Graham || VATT || TIR || align=right | 1.8 km || 
|-id=736 bgcolor=#fefefe
| 612736 ||  || — || January 15, 2004 || Kitt Peak || Spacewatch || H || align=right data-sort-value="0.50" | 500 m || 
|-id=737 bgcolor=#E9E9E9
| 612737 ||  || — || January 12, 2004 || Palomar || NEAT ||  || align=right | 1.6 km || 
|-id=738 bgcolor=#d6d6d6
| 612738 ||  || — || January 22, 2004 || Palomar || NEAT ||  || align=right | 2.8 km || 
|-id=739 bgcolor=#E9E9E9
| 612739 ||  || — || January 27, 2004 || Anderson Mesa || LONEOS ||  || align=right | 1.2 km || 
|-id=740 bgcolor=#d6d6d6
| 612740 ||  || — || January 28, 2004 || Kitt Peak || Spacewatch ||  || align=right | 2.2 km || 
|-id=741 bgcolor=#E9E9E9
| 612741 ||  || — || January 28, 2004 || Kitt Peak || Spacewatch ||  || align=right data-sort-value="0.83" | 830 m || 
|-id=742 bgcolor=#FA8072
| 612742 ||  || — || January 31, 2004 || Socorro || LINEAR ||  || align=right | 1.3 km || 
|-id=743 bgcolor=#E9E9E9
| 612743 ||  || — || January 29, 2004 || Socorro || LINEAR ||  || align=right | 1.0 km || 
|-id=744 bgcolor=#d6d6d6
| 612744 ||  || — || January 19, 2004 || Kitt Peak || Spacewatch || THM || align=right | 2.0 km || 
|-id=745 bgcolor=#d6d6d6
| 612745 ||  || — || January 19, 2004 || Kitt Peak || Spacewatch ||  || align=right | 1.5 km || 
|-id=746 bgcolor=#E9E9E9
| 612746 ||  || — || January 16, 2004 || Kitt Peak || Spacewatch ||  || align=right data-sort-value="0.74" | 740 m || 
|-id=747 bgcolor=#d6d6d6
| 612747 ||  || — || February 11, 2004 || Kitt Peak || Spacewatch ||  || align=right | 3.6 km || 
|-id=748 bgcolor=#E9E9E9
| 612748 ||  || — || February 11, 2004 || Kitt Peak || Spacewatch ||  || align=right | 1.2 km || 
|-id=749 bgcolor=#d6d6d6
| 612749 ||  || — || February 12, 2004 || Kitt Peak || Spacewatch || EOS || align=right | 2.1 km || 
|-id=750 bgcolor=#FFC2E0
| 612750 ||  || — || February 14, 2004 || Haleakala || NEAT || AMO || align=right data-sort-value="0.48" | 480 m || 
|-id=751 bgcolor=#FA8072
| 612751 ||  || — || February 14, 2004 || Catalina || CSS ||  || align=right data-sort-value="0.30" | 300 m || 
|-id=752 bgcolor=#E9E9E9
| 612752 ||  || — || February 12, 2004 || Palomar || NEAT ||  || align=right data-sort-value="0.98" | 980 m || 
|-id=753 bgcolor=#fefefe
| 612753 ||  || — || February 12, 2004 || Kitt Peak || Spacewatch ||  || align=right data-sort-value="0.53" | 530 m || 
|-id=754 bgcolor=#d6d6d6
| 612754 ||  || — || February 12, 2004 || Kitt Peak || Spacewatch ||  || align=right | 1.7 km || 
|-id=755 bgcolor=#FA8072
| 612755 ||  || — || February 18, 2004 || Nogales || Tenagra II Obs. || H || align=right data-sort-value="0.60" | 600 m || 
|-id=756 bgcolor=#E9E9E9
| 612756 ||  || — || February 17, 2004 || Kitt Peak || Spacewatch ||  || align=right data-sort-value="0.91" | 910 m || 
|-id=757 bgcolor=#d6d6d6
| 612757 ||  || — || February 23, 2004 || Socorro || LINEAR ||  || align=right | 4.2 km || 
|-id=758 bgcolor=#E9E9E9
| 612758 ||  || — || March 14, 2004 || Socorro || LINEAR ||  || align=right | 1.2 km || 
|-id=759 bgcolor=#d6d6d6
| 612759 ||  || — || March 12, 2004 || Palomar || NEAT ||  || align=right | 3.1 km || 
|-id=760 bgcolor=#FFC2E0
| 612760 ||  || — || March 15, 2004 || Socorro || LINEAR || AMO || align=right data-sort-value="0.11" | 110 m || 
|-id=761 bgcolor=#FA8072
| 612761 ||  || — || March 15, 2004 || Socorro || LINEAR || Tj (2.78) || align=right | 1.3 km || 
|-id=762 bgcolor=#FA8072
| 612762 ||  || — || March 15, 2004 || Kitt Peak || Spacewatch ||  || align=right data-sort-value="0.48" | 480 m || 
|-id=763 bgcolor=#fefefe
| 612763 ||  || — || March 15, 2004 || Kitt Peak || Spacewatch || H || align=right data-sort-value="0.57" | 570 m || 
|-id=764 bgcolor=#d6d6d6
| 612764 ||  || — || March 15, 2004 || Kitt Peak || Spacewatch ||  || align=right | 1.6 km || 
|-id=765 bgcolor=#E9E9E9
| 612765 ||  || — || March 11, 2004 || Palomar || NEAT ||  || align=right data-sort-value="0.85" | 850 m || 
|-id=766 bgcolor=#fefefe
| 612766 ||  || — || March 15, 2004 || Socorro || LINEAR ||  || align=right data-sort-value="0.73" | 730 m || 
|-id=767 bgcolor=#d6d6d6
| 612767 ||  || — || March 16, 2004 || Kitt Peak || Spacewatch ||  || align=right | 2.3 km || 
|-id=768 bgcolor=#fefefe
| 612768 ||  || — || March 19, 2004 || Socorro || LINEAR ||  || align=right data-sort-value="0.65" | 650 m || 
|-id=769 bgcolor=#d6d6d6
| 612769 ||  || — || March 18, 2004 || Kitt Peak || Spacewatch ||  || align=right | 2.3 km || 
|-id=770 bgcolor=#E9E9E9
| 612770 ||  || — || March 23, 2004 || Kitt Peak || Spacewatch ||  || align=right data-sort-value="0.89" | 890 m || 
|-id=771 bgcolor=#d6d6d6
| 612771 ||  || — || March 23, 2004 || Kitt Peak || Spacewatch ||  || align=right | 1.8 km || 
|-id=772 bgcolor=#C2E0FF
| 612772 ||  || — || March 16, 2004 || Kitt Peak || M. W. Buie || plutinocritical || align=right | 145 km || 
|-id=773 bgcolor=#E9E9E9
| 612773 ||  || — || April 13, 2004 || Kitt Peak || Spacewatch ||  || align=right data-sort-value="0.96" | 960 m || 
|-id=774 bgcolor=#FA8072
| 612774 ||  || — || April 21, 2004 || Socorro || LINEAR ||  || align=right data-sort-value="0.27" | 270 m || 
|-id=775 bgcolor=#FA8072
| 612775 ||  || — || April 22, 2004 || Siding Spring || SSS || Tj (2.97) || align=right | 1.9 km || 
|-id=776 bgcolor=#FA8072
| 612776 ||  || — || May 19, 2004 || Kitt Peak || Spacewatch ||  || align=right data-sort-value="0.51" | 510 m || 
|-id=777 bgcolor=#FFC2E0
| 612777 ||  || — || June 12, 2004 || Socorro || LINEAR || AMO || align=right data-sort-value="0.71" | 710 m || 
|-id=778 bgcolor=#d6d6d6
| 612778 ||  || — || June 14, 2004 || Socorro || LINEAR ||  || align=right | 2.5 km || 
|-id=779 bgcolor=#FA8072
| 612779 ||  || — || June 14, 2004 || Kitt Peak || Spacewatch ||  || align=right data-sort-value="0.55" | 550 m || 
|-id=780 bgcolor=#FFC2E0
| 612780 ||  || — || June 16, 2004 || Socorro || LINEAR || APOPHA || align=right data-sort-value="0.32" | 320 m || 
|-id=781 bgcolor=#FFC2E0
| 612781 ||  || — || June 20, 2004 || Socorro || LINEAR || APO || align=right data-sort-value="0.47" | 470 m || 
|-id=782 bgcolor=#E9E9E9
| 612782 ||  || — || July 8, 2004 || Reedy Creek || J. Broughton ||  || align=right | 1.1 km || 
|-id=783 bgcolor=#FA8072
| 612783 ||  || — || July 14, 2004 || Socorro || LINEAR ||  || align=right | 1.2 km || 
|-id=784 bgcolor=#E9E9E9
| 612784 ||  || — || July 14, 2004 || Socorro || LINEAR ||  || align=right data-sort-value="0.69" | 690 m || 
|-id=785 bgcolor=#E9E9E9
| 612785 ||  || — || July 11, 2004 || Socorro || LINEAR ||  || align=right data-sort-value="0.99" | 990 m || 
|-id=786 bgcolor=#FFC2E0
| 612786 ||  || — || August 8, 2004 || Socorro || LINEAR || APOPHA || align=right data-sort-value="0.17" | 170 m || 
|-id=787 bgcolor=#E9E9E9
| 612787 Haumannpéter ||  ||  || August 8, 2004 || Piszkesteto || K. Sárneczky, G. Szabó ||  || align=right data-sort-value="0.86" | 860 m || 
|-id=788 bgcolor=#FA8072
| 612788 ||  || — || August 9, 2004 || Siding Spring || SSS ||  || align=right | 1.3 km || 
|-id=789 bgcolor=#fefefe
| 612789 ||  || — || August 7, 2004 || Palomar || NEAT ||  || align=right data-sort-value="0.58" | 580 m || 
|-id=790 bgcolor=#fefefe
| 612790 ||  || — || August 10, 2004 || Campo Imperatore || CINEOS ||  || align=right data-sort-value="0.66" | 660 m || 
|-id=791 bgcolor=#d6d6d6
| 612791 ||  || — || August 9, 2004 || Anderson Mesa || LONEOS || THB || align=right | 2.4 km || 
|-id=792 bgcolor=#d6d6d6
| 612792 ||  || — || August 15, 2004 || Reedy Creek || J. Broughton ||  || align=right | 2.3 km || 
|-id=793 bgcolor=#C2E0FF
| 612793 ||  || — || August 13, 2004 || Cerro Tololo || M. W. Buie || res4:7critical || align=right | 173 km || 
|-id=794 bgcolor=#C2E0FF
| 612794 ||  || — || August 14, 2004 || Cerro Tololo || M. W. Buie || cubewano (cold) || align=right | 227 km || 
|-id=795 bgcolor=#C2E0FF
| 612795 ||  || — || August 14, 2004 || Cerro Tololo || M. W. Buie || cubewano (cold)critical || align=right | 180 km || 
|-id=796 bgcolor=#E9E9E9
| 612796 ||  || — || August 10, 2004 || Socorro || LINEAR || EUN || align=right | 1.1 km || 
|-id=797 bgcolor=#fefefe
| 612797 ||  || — || August 12, 2004 || Campo Imperatore || CINEOS ||  || align=right data-sort-value="0.62" | 620 m || 
|-id=798 bgcolor=#C2E0FF
| 612798 ||  || — || August 13, 2004 || Cerro Tololo || M. W. Buie || plutino?critical || align=right | 141 km || 
|-id=799 bgcolor=#d6d6d6
| 612799 ||  || — || August 22, 2004 || Kitt Peak || Spacewatch || EOS || align=right | 1.7 km || 
|-id=800 bgcolor=#FFC2E0
| 612800 ||  || — || August 25, 2004 || Socorro || LINEAR || AMO || align=right data-sort-value="0.56" | 560 m || 
|}

612801–612900 

|-bgcolor=#FFC2E0
| 612801 ||  || — || August 25, 2004 || Socorro || LINEAR || AMO || align=right data-sort-value="0.38" | 380 m || 
|-id=802 bgcolor=#C7FF8F
| 612802 ||  || — || August 17, 2004 || Mauna Kea || D. J. Tholen || centaurcritical || align=right | 49 km || 
|-id=803 bgcolor=#fefefe
| 612803 ||  || — || September 6, 2004 || Socorro || LINEAR || PHO || align=right | 1.0 km || 
|-id=804 bgcolor=#FA8072
| 612804 ||  || — || September 7, 2004 || Socorro || LINEAR ||  || align=right | 1.2 km || 
|-id=805 bgcolor=#fefefe
| 612805 ||  || — || September 7, 2004 || Kitt Peak || Spacewatch || MAS || align=right data-sort-value="0.78" | 780 m || 
|-id=806 bgcolor=#fefefe
| 612806 ||  || — || September 8, 2004 || Klet || Kleť Obs. ||  || align=right data-sort-value="0.68" | 680 m || 
|-id=807 bgcolor=#E9E9E9
| 612807 ||  || — || September 7, 2004 || Socorro || LINEAR ||  || align=right | 1.6 km || 
|-id=808 bgcolor=#fefefe
| 612808 ||  || — || September 7, 2004 || Kitt Peak || Spacewatch || NYS || align=right data-sort-value="0.64" | 640 m || 
|-id=809 bgcolor=#E9E9E9
| 612809 ||  || — || September 8, 2004 || Socorro || LINEAR ||  || align=right data-sort-value="0.86" | 860 m || 
|-id=810 bgcolor=#E9E9E9
| 612810 ||  || — || September 8, 2004 || Socorro || LINEAR ||  || align=right | 1.2 km || 
|-id=811 bgcolor=#fefefe
| 612811 ||  || — || September 8, 2004 || Socorro || LINEAR || NYS || align=right data-sort-value="0.68" | 680 m || 
|-id=812 bgcolor=#fefefe
| 612812 ||  || — || September 8, 2004 || Socorro || LINEAR ||  || align=right data-sort-value="0.59" | 590 m || 
|-id=813 bgcolor=#FFC2E0
| 612813 ||  || — || September 10, 2004 || Socorro || LINEAR || APOPHA || align=right data-sort-value="0.75" | 750 m || 
|-id=814 bgcolor=#FA8072
| 612814 ||  || — || September 10, 2004 || Socorro || LINEAR || H || align=right data-sort-value="0.36" | 360 m || 
|-id=815 bgcolor=#fefefe
| 612815 ||  || — || September 8, 2004 || Palomar || NEAT || H || align=right data-sort-value="0.66" | 660 m || 
|-id=816 bgcolor=#E9E9E9
| 612816 ||  || — || September 9, 2004 || Bergisch Gladbach || W. Bickel ||  || align=right data-sort-value="0.63" | 630 m || 
|-id=817 bgcolor=#d6d6d6
| 612817 ||  || — || September 8, 2004 || Palomar || NEAT ||  || align=right | 2.2 km || 
|-id=818 bgcolor=#fefefe
| 612818 ||  || — || September 9, 2004 || Socorro || LINEAR ||  || align=right data-sort-value="0.68" | 680 m || 
|-id=819 bgcolor=#FA8072
| 612819 ||  || — || September 11, 2004 || Socorro || LINEAR || Tj (2.91) || align=right | 1.9 km || 
|-id=820 bgcolor=#d6d6d6
| 612820 ||  || — || September 10, 2004 || Socorro || LINEAR ||  || align=right | 1.6 km || 
|-id=821 bgcolor=#fefefe
| 612821 ||  || — || September 7, 2004 || Kitt Peak || Spacewatch || NYS || align=right data-sort-value="0.58" | 580 m || 
|-id=822 bgcolor=#fefefe
| 612822 ||  || — || September 7, 2004 || Kitt Peak || Spacewatch ||  || align=right data-sort-value="0.68" | 680 m || 
|-id=823 bgcolor=#E9E9E9
| 612823 ||  || — || September 9, 2004 || Socorro || LINEAR ||  || align=right data-sort-value="0.88" | 880 m || 
|-id=824 bgcolor=#d6d6d6
| 612824 ||  || — || September 9, 2004 || Socorro || LINEAR ||  || align=right | 1.9 km || 
|-id=825 bgcolor=#E9E9E9
| 612825 ||  || — || September 9, 2004 || Socorro || LINEAR ||  || align=right data-sort-value="0.71" | 710 m || 
|-id=826 bgcolor=#fefefe
| 612826 ||  || — || September 10, 2004 || Socorro || LINEAR ||  || align=right data-sort-value="0.60" | 600 m || 
|-id=827 bgcolor=#fefefe
| 612827 ||  || — || September 10, 2004 || Socorro || LINEAR ||  || align=right data-sort-value="0.57" | 570 m || 
|-id=828 bgcolor=#fefefe
| 612828 ||  || — || September 8, 2004 || Socorro || LINEAR ||  || align=right data-sort-value="0.72" | 720 m || 
|-id=829 bgcolor=#E9E9E9
| 612829 ||  || — || September 9, 2004 || Socorro || LINEAR ||  || align=right data-sort-value="0.78" | 780 m || 
|-id=830 bgcolor=#E9E9E9
| 612830 ||  || — || September 10, 2004 || Socorro || LINEAR ||  || align=right | 1.9 km || 
|-id=831 bgcolor=#E9E9E9
| 612831 ||  || — || September 10, 2004 || Socorro || LINEAR ||  || align=right | 1.3 km || 
|-id=832 bgcolor=#E9E9E9
| 612832 ||  || — || September 10, 2004 || Socorro || LINEAR ||  || align=right | 1.00 km || 
|-id=833 bgcolor=#E9E9E9
| 612833 ||  || — || September 10, 2004 || Eskridge || Farpoint Obs. ||  || align=right | 1.5 km || 
|-id=834 bgcolor=#E9E9E9
| 612834 ||  || — || September 11, 2004 || Socorro || LINEAR ||  || align=right | 1.6 km || 
|-id=835 bgcolor=#E9E9E9
| 612835 ||  || — || September 11, 2004 || Socorro || LINEAR || EUN || align=right data-sort-value="0.97" | 970 m || 
|-id=836 bgcolor=#fefefe
| 612836 ||  || — || September 9, 2004 || Kitt Peak || Spacewatch ||  || align=right data-sort-value="0.68" | 680 m || 
|-id=837 bgcolor=#fefefe
| 612837 ||  || — || September 10, 2004 || Kitt Peak || Spacewatch || MAS || align=right data-sort-value="0.61" | 610 m || 
|-id=838 bgcolor=#fefefe
| 612838 ||  || — || September 11, 2004 || Kitt Peak || Spacewatch ||  || align=right data-sort-value="0.44" | 440 m || 
|-id=839 bgcolor=#fefefe
| 612839 ||  || — || September 13, 2004 || Kitt Peak || Spacewatch ||  || align=right data-sort-value="0.63" | 630 m || 
|-id=840 bgcolor=#fefefe
| 612840 ||  || — || September 13, 2004 || Kitt Peak || Spacewatch ||  || align=right data-sort-value="0.62" | 620 m || 
|-id=841 bgcolor=#d6d6d6
| 612841 ||  || — || September 15, 2004 || Kitt Peak || Spacewatch ||  || align=right | 2.2 km || 
|-id=842 bgcolor=#fefefe
| 612842 ||  || — || September 15, 2004 || Kitt Peak || Spacewatch ||  || align=right data-sort-value="0.67" | 670 m || 
|-id=843 bgcolor=#d6d6d6
| 612843 ||  || — || September 15, 2004 || Kitt Peak || Spacewatch ||  || align=right | 3.3 km || 
|-id=844 bgcolor=#fefefe
| 612844 ||  || — || September 9, 2004 || Kitt Peak || Spacewatch ||  || align=right data-sort-value="0.78" | 780 m || 
|-id=845 bgcolor=#E9E9E9
| 612845 ||  || — || September 8, 2004 || Socorro || LINEAR ||  || align=right data-sort-value="0.73" | 730 m || 
|-id=846 bgcolor=#fefefe
| 612846 ||  || — || September 11, 2004 || Kitt Peak || Spacewatch ||  || align=right data-sort-value="0.65" | 650 m || 
|-id=847 bgcolor=#fefefe
| 612847 ||  || — || September 13, 2004 || Socorro || LINEAR ||  || align=right data-sort-value="0.75" | 750 m || 
|-id=848 bgcolor=#FA8072
| 612848 ||  || — || September 15, 2004 || Anderson Mesa || LONEOS ||  || align=right data-sort-value="0.60" | 600 m || 
|-id=849 bgcolor=#fefefe
| 612849 ||  || — || September 12, 2004 || Kitt Peak || Spacewatch ||  || align=right data-sort-value="0.93" | 930 m || 
|-id=850 bgcolor=#E9E9E9
| 612850 ||  || — || September 15, 2004 || Kitt Peak || Spacewatch ||  || align=right data-sort-value="0.78" | 780 m || 
|-id=851 bgcolor=#d6d6d6
| 612851 ||  || — || September 6, 2004 || Socorro || LINEAR ||  || align=right | 3.6 km || 
|-id=852 bgcolor=#fefefe
| 612852 ||  || — || September 17, 2004 || Kitt Peak || Spacewatch || MAS || align=right data-sort-value="0.76" | 760 m || 
|-id=853 bgcolor=#fefefe
| 612853 ||  || — || September 17, 2004 || Anderson Mesa || LONEOS ||  || align=right data-sort-value="0.77" | 770 m || 
|-id=854 bgcolor=#d6d6d6
| 612854 ||  || — || September 17, 2004 || Kitt Peak || Spacewatch ||  || align=right | 2.3 km || 
|-id=855 bgcolor=#E9E9E9
| 612855 ||  || — || September 17, 2004 || Kitt Peak || Spacewatch ||  || align=right data-sort-value="0.64" | 640 m || 
|-id=856 bgcolor=#FFC2E0
| 612856 ||  || — || October 5, 2004 || Anderson Mesa || LONEOS || APOPHA || align=right data-sort-value="0.25" | 250 m || 
|-id=857 bgcolor=#d6d6d6
| 612857 ||  || — || October 4, 2004 || Kitt Peak || Spacewatch ||  || align=right | 1.3 km || 
|-id=858 bgcolor=#FA8072
| 612858 ||  || — || October 7, 2004 || Kitt Peak || Spacewatch || H || align=right data-sort-value="0.68" | 680 m || 
|-id=859 bgcolor=#FA8072
| 612859 ||  || — || October 10, 2004 || Socorro || LINEAR || H || align=right data-sort-value="0.67" | 670 m || 
|-id=860 bgcolor=#E9E9E9
| 612860 ||  || — || October 7, 2004 || Socorro || LINEAR ||  || align=right | 1.3 km || 
|-id=861 bgcolor=#d6d6d6
| 612861 ||  || — || October 10, 2004 || Socorro || LINEAR ||  || align=right | 3.1 km || 
|-id=862 bgcolor=#E9E9E9
| 612862 ||  || — || October 4, 2004 || Kitt Peak || Spacewatch ||  || align=right data-sort-value="0.64" | 640 m || 
|-id=863 bgcolor=#E9E9E9
| 612863 ||  || — || October 5, 2004 || Kitt Peak || Spacewatch ||  || align=right | 1.2 km || 
|-id=864 bgcolor=#fefefe
| 612864 ||  || — || October 5, 2004 || Kitt Peak || Spacewatch || V || align=right data-sort-value="0.68" | 680 m || 
|-id=865 bgcolor=#E9E9E9
| 612865 ||  || — || October 5, 2004 || Kitt Peak || Spacewatch ||  || align=right | 1.4 km || 
|-id=866 bgcolor=#fefefe
| 612866 ||  || — || October 5, 2004 || Kitt Peak || Spacewatch ||  || align=right data-sort-value="0.45" | 450 m || 
|-id=867 bgcolor=#d6d6d6
| 612867 ||  || — || October 5, 2004 || Kitt Peak || Spacewatch ||  || align=right | 2.0 km || 
|-id=868 bgcolor=#d6d6d6
| 612868 ||  || — || October 5, 2004 || Kitt Peak || Spacewatch || KOR || align=right | 1.8 km || 
|-id=869 bgcolor=#fefefe
| 612869 ||  || — || October 6, 2004 || Kitt Peak || Spacewatch || V || align=right data-sort-value="0.77" | 770 m || 
|-id=870 bgcolor=#FA8072
| 612870 ||  || — || October 7, 2004 || Palomar || NEAT ||  || align=right | 1.0 km || 
|-id=871 bgcolor=#fefefe
| 612871 ||  || — || October 6, 2004 || Palomar || NEAT ||  || align=right data-sort-value="0.64" | 640 m || 
|-id=872 bgcolor=#E9E9E9
| 612872 ||  || — || October 7, 2004 || Palomar || NEAT ||  || align=right | 1.3 km || 
|-id=873 bgcolor=#fefefe
| 612873 ||  || — || October 9, 2004 || Anderson Mesa || LONEOS ||  || align=right data-sort-value="0.63" | 630 m || 
|-id=874 bgcolor=#E9E9E9
| 612874 ||  || — || October 6, 2004 || Kitt Peak || Spacewatch ||  || align=right data-sort-value="0.57" | 570 m || 
|-id=875 bgcolor=#d6d6d6
| 612875 ||  || — || October 6, 2004 || Kitt Peak || Spacewatch || EOS || align=right | 2.3 km || 
|-id=876 bgcolor=#E9E9E9
| 612876 ||  || — || October 6, 2004 || Kitt Peak || Spacewatch ||  || align=right data-sort-value="0.72" | 720 m || 
|-id=877 bgcolor=#fefefe
| 612877 ||  || — || October 7, 2004 || Kitt Peak || Spacewatch || NYS || align=right data-sort-value="0.58" | 580 m || 
|-id=878 bgcolor=#fefefe
| 612878 ||  || — || October 7, 2004 || Kitt Peak || Spacewatch || MAS || align=right data-sort-value="0.57" | 570 m || 
|-id=879 bgcolor=#E9E9E9
| 612879 ||  || — || October 7, 2004 || Kitt Peak || Spacewatch ||  || align=right data-sort-value="0.71" | 710 m || 
|-id=880 bgcolor=#E9E9E9
| 612880 ||  || — || October 7, 2004 || Kitt Peak || Spacewatch ||  || align=right data-sort-value="0.74" | 740 m || 
|-id=881 bgcolor=#fefefe
| 612881 ||  || — || October 7, 2004 || Kitt Peak || Spacewatch ||  || align=right data-sort-value="0.54" | 540 m || 
|-id=882 bgcolor=#d6d6d6
| 612882 ||  || — || October 8, 2004 || Kitt Peak || Spacewatch ||  || align=right | 1.4 km || 
|-id=883 bgcolor=#C2E0FF
| 612883 ||  || — || October 15, 2004 || Kitt Peak || M. W. Buie || SDO || align=right | 245 km || 
|-id=884 bgcolor=#d6d6d6
| 612884 ||  || — || October 8, 2004 || Kitt Peak || Spacewatch ||  || align=right | 2.4 km || 
|-id=885 bgcolor=#fefefe
| 612885 ||  || — || October 10, 2004 || Kitt Peak || Spacewatch ||  || align=right data-sort-value="0.53" | 530 m || 
|-id=886 bgcolor=#fefefe
| 612886 ||  || — || October 10, 2004 || Socorro || LINEAR ||  || align=right | 1.4 km || 
|-id=887 bgcolor=#E9E9E9
| 612887 ||  || — || October 11, 2004 || Kitt Peak || Spacewatch ||  || align=right data-sort-value="0.75" | 750 m || 
|-id=888 bgcolor=#E9E9E9
| 612888 ||  || — || October 10, 2004 || Kitt Peak || Spacewatch ||  || align=right data-sort-value="0.58" | 580 m || 
|-id=889 bgcolor=#fefefe
| 612889 ||  || — || October 12, 2004 || Kitt Peak || Spacewatch ||  || align=right data-sort-value="0.54" | 540 m || 
|-id=890 bgcolor=#d6d6d6
| 612890 ||  || — || October 6, 2004 || Palomar || NEAT ||  || align=right | 2.8 km || 
|-id=891 bgcolor=#C2E0FF
| 612891 ||  || — || October 15, 2004 || Kitt Peak || M. W. Buie || res2:5critical || align=right | 116 km || 
|-id=892 bgcolor=#C2E0FF
| 612892 ||  || — || October 15, 2004 || Kitt Peak || M. W. Buie || twotinocritical || align=right | 194 km || 
|-id=893 bgcolor=#fefefe
| 612893 ||  || — || October 8, 2004 || Kitt Peak || Spacewatch || NYS || align=right data-sort-value="0.67" | 670 m || 
|-id=894 bgcolor=#E9E9E9
| 612894 ||  || — || October 18, 2004 || Kitt Peak || M. W. Buie ||  || align=right data-sort-value="0.67" | 670 m || 
|-id=895 bgcolor=#d6d6d6
| 612895 ||  || — || November 3, 2004 || Catalina || CSS ||  || align=right | 3.4 km || 
|-id=896 bgcolor=#E9E9E9
| 612896 ||  || — || November 3, 2004 || Kitt Peak || Spacewatch ||  || align=right | 1.1 km || 
|-id=897 bgcolor=#d6d6d6
| 612897 ||  || — || November 10, 2004 || Kitt Peak || Spacewatch ||  || align=right | 2.3 km || 
|-id=898 bgcolor=#FA8072
| 612898 ||  || — || November 3, 2004 || Anderson Mesa || LONEOS || H || align=right data-sort-value="0.52" | 520 m || 
|-id=899 bgcolor=#E9E9E9
| 612899 ||  || — || November 10, 2004 || Kitt Peak || M. W. Buie ||  || align=right | 1.1 km || 
|-id=900 bgcolor=#FA8072
| 612900 ||  || — || December 9, 2004 || Kitt Peak || Spacewatch || H || align=right data-sort-value="0.77" | 770 m || 
|}

612901–613000 

|-bgcolor=#FFC2E0
| 612901 ||  || — || December 10, 2004 || Socorro || LINEAR || APOPHA || align=right data-sort-value="0.39" | 390 m || 
|-id=902 bgcolor=#d6d6d6
| 612902 ||  || — || December 8, 2004 || Socorro || LINEAR ||  || align=right | 2.1 km || 
|-id=903 bgcolor=#d6d6d6
| 612903 ||  || — || December 8, 2004 || Socorro || LINEAR ||  || align=right | 2.6 km || 
|-id=904 bgcolor=#FA8072
| 612904 ||  || — || December 10, 2004 || Needville || J. Dellinger, D. Wells ||  || align=right data-sort-value="0.84" | 840 m || 
|-id=905 bgcolor=#E9E9E9
| 612905 ||  || — || December 12, 2004 || Kitt Peak || Spacewatch ||  || align=right data-sort-value="0.86" | 860 m || 
|-id=906 bgcolor=#E9E9E9
| 612906 ||  || — || December 12, 2004 || Kitt Peak || Spacewatch || EUN || align=right | 1.1 km || 
|-id=907 bgcolor=#E9E9E9
| 612907 ||  || — || December 11, 2004 || Kitt Peak || Spacewatch ||  || align=right data-sort-value="0.63" | 630 m || 
|-id=908 bgcolor=#d6d6d6
| 612908 ||  || — || December 11, 2004 || Socorro || LINEAR ||  || align=right | 3.2 km || 
|-id=909 bgcolor=#d6d6d6
| 612909 ||  || — || December 15, 2004 || Socorro || LINEAR ||  || align=right | 2.7 km || 
|-id=910 bgcolor=#E9E9E9
| 612910 ||  || — || December 9, 2004 || Kitt Peak || Spacewatch ||  || align=right data-sort-value="0.67" | 670 m || 
|-id=911 bgcolor=#C2E0FF
| 612911 ||  || — || December 11, 2004 || Mauna Kea || Mauna Kea Obs. || other TNOcritical || align=right | 581 km || 
|-id=912 bgcolor=#FA8072
| 612912 ||  || — || December 17, 2004 || Socorro || LINEAR ||  || align=right | 1.2 km || 
|-id=913 bgcolor=#fefefe
| 612913 ||  || — || December 18, 2004 || Mount Lemmon || Mount Lemmon Survey || NYS || align=right data-sort-value="0.54" | 540 m || 
|-id=914 bgcolor=#d6d6d6
| 612914 ||  || — || December 19, 2004 || Mount Lemmon || Mount Lemmon Survey ||  || align=right | 3.0 km || 
|-id=915 bgcolor=#FA8072
| 612915 ||  || — || January 1, 2005 || Catalina || CSS ||  || align=right data-sort-value="0.70" | 700 m || 
|-id=916 bgcolor=#E9E9E9
| 612916 ||  || — || January 7, 2005 || Nogales || Tenagra II Obs. ||  || align=right data-sort-value="0.97" | 970 m || 
|-id=917 bgcolor=#d6d6d6
| 612917 ||  || — || January 7, 2005 || Catalina || CSS || Tj (2.97) || align=right | 2.7 km || 
|-id=918 bgcolor=#d6d6d6
| 612918 ||  || — || January 11, 2005 || Socorro || LINEAR ||  || align=right | 2.4 km || 
|-id=919 bgcolor=#E9E9E9
| 612919 ||  || — || January 11, 2005 || Socorro || LINEAR ||  || align=right data-sort-value="0.87" | 870 m || 
|-id=920 bgcolor=#d6d6d6
| 612920 ||  || — || January 11, 2005 || Socorro || LINEAR ||  || align=right | 3.7 km || 
|-id=921 bgcolor=#d6d6d6
| 612921 ||  || — || January 15, 2005 || Socorro || LINEAR ||  || align=right | 2.5 km || 
|-id=922 bgcolor=#FFC2E0
| 612922 ||  || — || January 18, 2005 || Kitt Peak || Spacewatch || APO +1km || align=right data-sort-value="0.87" | 870 m || 
|-id=923 bgcolor=#E9E9E9
| 612923 ||  || — || January 16, 2005 || Mauna Kea || C. Veillet ||  || align=right | 1.2 km || 
|-id=924 bgcolor=#FFC2E0
| 612924 ||  || — || February 2, 2005 || Socorro || LINEAR || APOPHA || align=right data-sort-value="0.31" | 310 m || 
|-id=925 bgcolor=#fefefe
| 612925 ||  || — || February 1, 2005 || Kitt Peak || Spacewatch ||  || align=right data-sort-value="0.62" | 620 m || 
|-id=926 bgcolor=#d6d6d6
| 612926 ||  || — || February 4, 2005 || Socorro || LINEAR || Tj (2.98) || align=right | 4.1 km || 
|-id=927 bgcolor=#E9E9E9
| 612927 ||  || — || February 2, 2005 || Kitt Peak || Spacewatch ||  || align=right data-sort-value="0.93" | 930 m || 
|-id=928 bgcolor=#fefefe
| 612928 ||  || — || February 2, 2005 || Palomar || NEAT ||  || align=right | 2.1 km || 
|-id=929 bgcolor=#FFC2E0
| 612929 ||  || — || February 8, 2005 || Crni Vrh || H. Mikuž || APO || align=right | 1.2 km || 
|-id=930 bgcolor=#fefefe
| 612930 ||  || — || February 4, 2005 || Mount Lemmon || Mount Lemmon Survey || MAS || align=right data-sort-value="0.58" | 580 m || 
|-id=931 bgcolor=#C2E0FF
| 612931 ||  || — || February 1, 2005 || Palomar || Palomar Obs. || twotino || align=right | 402 km || 
|-id=932 bgcolor=#d6d6d6
| 612932 ||  || — || February 1, 2005 || Kitt Peak || Spacewatch ||  || align=right | 3.6 km || 
|-id=933 bgcolor=#d6d6d6
| 612933 ||  || — || March 2, 2005 || Kitt Peak || Spacewatch ||  || align=right | 1.1 km || 
|-id=934 bgcolor=#E9E9E9
| 612934 ||  || — || March 4, 2005 || Kitt Peak || Spacewatch ||  || align=right | 1.7 km || 
|-id=935 bgcolor=#fefefe
| 612935 ||  || — || March 4, 2005 || Kitt Peak || Spacewatch || NYS || align=right data-sort-value="0.68" | 680 m || 
|-id=936 bgcolor=#d6d6d6
| 612936 ||  || — || March 8, 2005 || Mount Lemmon || Mount Lemmon Survey ||  || align=right | 2.1 km || 
|-id=937 bgcolor=#FA8072
| 612937 ||  || — || March 8, 2005 || Socorro || LINEAR ||  || align=right | 1.7 km || 
|-id=938 bgcolor=#d6d6d6
| 612938 ||  || — || March 4, 2005 || Mount Lemmon || Mount Lemmon Survey ||  || align=right | 2.7 km || 
|-id=939 bgcolor=#E9E9E9
| 612939 ||  || — || March 9, 2005 || Mount Lemmon || Mount Lemmon Survey ||  || align=right | 1.6 km || 
|-id=940 bgcolor=#d6d6d6
| 612940 ||  || — || March 9, 2005 || Mount Lemmon || Mount Lemmon Survey || THM || align=right | 2.2 km || 
|-id=941 bgcolor=#d6d6d6
| 612941 ||  || — || March 11, 2005 || Kitt Peak || Spacewatch || EUP || align=right | 2.8 km || 
|-id=942 bgcolor=#fefefe
| 612942 ||  || — || March 11, 2005 || Kitt Peak || Spacewatch ||  || align=right data-sort-value="0.50" | 500 m || 
|-id=943 bgcolor=#E9E9E9
| 612943 ||  || — || March 11, 2005 || Mount Lemmon || Mount Lemmon Survey ||  || align=right | 1.8 km || 
|-id=944 bgcolor=#E9E9E9
| 612944 ||  || — || March 4, 2005 || Kitt Peak || Spacewatch ||  || align=right | 1.3 km || 
|-id=945 bgcolor=#E9E9E9
| 612945 ||  || — || March 4, 2005 || Socorro || LINEAR ||  || align=right data-sort-value="0.83" | 830 m || 
|-id=946 bgcolor=#d6d6d6
| 612946 ||  || — || March 10, 2005 || Moletai || Molėtai Obs. ||  || align=right | 2.0 km || 
|-id=947 bgcolor=#d6d6d6
| 612947 ||  || — || March 10, 2005 || Mount Lemmon || Mount Lemmon Survey ||  || align=right | 2.2 km || 
|-id=948 bgcolor=#d6d6d6
| 612948 ||  || — || March 11, 2005 || Kitt Peak || Spacewatch ||  || align=right | 1.9 km || 
|-id=949 bgcolor=#d6d6d6
| 612949 ||  || — || March 11, 2005 || Mount Lemmon || Mount Lemmon Survey ||  || align=right | 1.7 km || 
|-id=950 bgcolor=#d6d6d6
| 612950 ||  || — || March 9, 2005 || Kitt Peak || M. W. Buie || THM || align=right | 1.5 km || 
|-id=951 bgcolor=#C2E0FF
| 612951 ||  || — || March 11, 2005 || Kitt Peak || M. W. Buie || centaur || align=right | 92 km || 
|-id=952 bgcolor=#C2E0FF
| 612952 ||  || — || March 11, 2005 || Kitt Peak || M. W. Buie || plutinocritical || align=right | 134 km || 
|-id=953 bgcolor=#C2E0FF
| 612953 ||  || — || March 12, 2005 || Kitt Peak || M. W. Buie || res3:4critical || align=right | 110 km || 
|-id=954 bgcolor=#FA8072
| 612954 ||  || — || March 22, 2005 || Socorro || LINEAR ||  || align=right | 1.5 km || 
|-id=955 bgcolor=#FFC2E0
| 612955 ||  || — || April 1, 2005 || Catalina || CSS || APO || align=right data-sort-value="0.29" | 290 m || 
|-id=956 bgcolor=#E9E9E9
| 612956 ||  || — || April 2, 2005 || Mount Lemmon || Mount Lemmon Survey ||  || align=right | 1.7 km || 
|-id=957 bgcolor=#d6d6d6
| 612957 ||  || — || April 5, 2005 || Mount Lemmon || Mount Lemmon Survey ||  || align=right | 2.4 km || 
|-id=958 bgcolor=#d6d6d6
| 612958 ||  || — || April 5, 2005 || Kitt Peak || Spacewatch ||  || align=right | 1.8 km || 
|-id=959 bgcolor=#d6d6d6
| 612959 ||  || — || April 1, 2005 || Anderson Mesa || LONEOS ||  || align=right | 2.3 km || 
|-id=960 bgcolor=#d6d6d6
| 612960 ||  || — || April 2, 2005 || Catalina || CSS ||  || align=right | 2.0 km || 
|-id=961 bgcolor=#E9E9E9
| 612961 ||  || — || April 4, 2005 || Catalina || CSS ||  || align=right | 3.1 km || 
|-id=962 bgcolor=#E9E9E9
| 612962 ||  || — || April 10, 2005 || Mount Lemmon || Mount Lemmon Survey ||  || align=right | 1.2 km || 
|-id=963 bgcolor=#d6d6d6
| 612963 ||  || — || April 10, 2005 || Kitt Peak || Spacewatch ||  || align=right | 2.4 km || 
|-id=964 bgcolor=#d6d6d6
| 612964 ||  || — || April 15, 2005 || Kitt Peak || Spacewatch || LIX || align=right | 3.2 km || 
|-id=965 bgcolor=#fefefe
| 612965 ||  || — || April 12, 2005 || Kitt Peak || M. W. Buie ||  || align=right data-sort-value="0.52" | 520 m || 
|-id=966 bgcolor=#fefefe
| 612966 ||  || — || April 12, 2005 || Kitt Peak || M. W. Buie || NYS || align=right data-sort-value="0.62" | 620 m || 
|-id=967 bgcolor=#E9E9E9
| 612967 ||  || — || April 10, 2005 || Kitt Peak || M. W. Buie ||  || align=right data-sort-value="0.63" | 630 m || 
|-id=968 bgcolor=#fefefe
| 612968 ||  || — || April 9, 2005 || Junk Bond || Junk Bond Obs. ||  || align=right data-sort-value="0.72" | 720 m || 
|-id=969 bgcolor=#d6d6d6
| 612969 ||  || — || April 2, 2005 || Kitt Peak || Spacewatch ||  || align=right | 1.6 km || 
|-id=970 bgcolor=#FFC2E0
| 612970 ||  || — || April 21, 2005 || Socorro || LINEAR || ATE || align=right data-sort-value="0.20" | 200 m || 
|-id=971 bgcolor=#d6d6d6
| 612971 ||  || — || April 30, 2005 || Kitt Peak || Spacewatch ||  || align=right | 2.7 km || 
|-id=972 bgcolor=#E9E9E9
| 612972 ||  || — || May 4, 2005 || Mauna Kea || C. Veillet ||  || align=right | 1.2 km || 
|-id=973 bgcolor=#E9E9E9
| 612973 ||  || — || May 4, 2005 || Mauna Kea || C. Veillet ||  || align=right data-sort-value="0.79" | 790 m || 
|-id=974 bgcolor=#E9E9E9
| 612974 ||  || — || May 4, 2005 || Mount Lemmon || Mount Lemmon Survey ||  || align=right | 1.4 km || 
|-id=975 bgcolor=#E9E9E9
| 612975 ||  || — || May 4, 2005 || Mount Lemmon || Mount Lemmon Survey ||  || align=right | 2.2 km || 
|-id=976 bgcolor=#d6d6d6
| 612976 ||  || — || May 3, 2005 || Kitt Peak || Spacewatch ||  || align=right | 1.8 km || 
|-id=977 bgcolor=#E9E9E9
| 612977 ||  || — || May 4, 2005 || Kitt Peak || Spacewatch ||  || align=right data-sort-value="0.86" | 860 m || 
|-id=978 bgcolor=#d6d6d6
| 612978 ||  || — || May 6, 2005 || Socorro || LINEAR ||  || align=right | 2.8 km || 
|-id=979 bgcolor=#E9E9E9
| 612979 ||  || — || May 10, 2005 || Kitt Peak || Spacewatch ||  || align=right data-sort-value="0.76" | 760 m || 
|-id=980 bgcolor=#d6d6d6
| 612980 ||  || — || May 2, 2005 || Kitt Peak || DLS ||  || align=right | 2.5 km || 
|-id=981 bgcolor=#d6d6d6
| 612981 ||  || — || May 8, 2005 || Kitt Peak || Spacewatch ||  || align=right | 1.8 km || 
|-id=982 bgcolor=#FFC2E0
| 612982 ||  || — || May 14, 2005 || Socorro || LINEAR || AMOcritical || align=right data-sort-value="0.41" | 410 m || 
|-id=983 bgcolor=#fefefe
| 612983 ||  || — || May 10, 2005 || Kitt Peak || Spacewatch ||  || align=right data-sort-value="0.51" | 510 m || 
|-id=984 bgcolor=#FA8072
| 612984 ||  || — || May 14, 2005 || Kitt Peak || Spacewatch ||  || align=right data-sort-value="0.67" | 670 m || 
|-id=985 bgcolor=#C2E0FF
| 612985 ||  || — || May 10, 2005 || Cerro Tololo || M. W. Buie || cubewano?critical || align=right | 271 km || 
|-id=986 bgcolor=#fefefe
| 612986 ||  || — || June 5, 2005 || Kitt Peak || Spacewatch || H || align=right data-sort-value="0.65" | 650 m || 
|-id=987 bgcolor=#fefefe
| 612987 ||  || — || June 8, 2005 || Kitt Peak || Spacewatch ||  || align=right data-sort-value="0.55" | 550 m || 
|-id=988 bgcolor=#FA8072
| 612988 ||  || — || June 11, 2005 || Kitt Peak || Spacewatch ||  || align=right data-sort-value="0.80" | 800 m || 
|-id=989 bgcolor=#FFC2E0
| 612989 ||  || — || June 15, 2005 || Socorro || LINEAR || APOPHA || align=right data-sort-value="0.36" | 360 m || 
|-id=990 bgcolor=#FA8072
| 612990 ||  || — || June 10, 2005 || Kitt Peak || Spacewatch ||  || align=right data-sort-value="0.53" | 530 m || 
|-id=991 bgcolor=#FFC2E0
| 612991 ||  || — || June 21, 2005 || Palomar || NEAT || APO || align=right data-sort-value="0.45" | 450 m || 
|-id=992 bgcolor=#E9E9E9
| 612992 ||  || — || June 27, 2005 || Kitt Peak || Spacewatch ||  || align=right | 1.5 km || 
|-id=993 bgcolor=#d6d6d6
| 612993 ||  || — || June 29, 2005 || Kitt Peak || Spacewatch ||  || align=right | 2.3 km || 
|-id=994 bgcolor=#fefefe
| 612994 ||  || — || July 1, 2005 || Kitt Peak || Spacewatch ||  || align=right data-sort-value="0.78" | 780 m || 
|-id=995 bgcolor=#E9E9E9
| 612995 ||  || — || July 1, 2005 || Kitt Peak || Spacewatch ||  || align=right | 1.7 km || 
|-id=996 bgcolor=#fefefe
| 612996 ||  || — || July 3, 2005 || Mount Lemmon || Mount Lemmon Survey ||  || align=right data-sort-value="0.55" | 550 m || 
|-id=997 bgcolor=#fefefe
| 612997 ||  || — || July 2, 2005 || Kitt Peak || Spacewatch ||  || align=right data-sort-value="0.58" | 580 m || 
|-id=998 bgcolor=#fefefe
| 612998 ||  || — || July 5, 2005 || Kitt Peak || Spacewatch || MAS || align=right data-sort-value="0.52" | 520 m || 
|-id=999 bgcolor=#E9E9E9
| 612999 ||  || — || July 6, 2005 || Kitt Peak || Spacewatch ||  || align=right data-sort-value="0.80" | 800 m || 
|-id=000 bgcolor=#fefefe
| 613000 ||  || — || July 7, 2005 || Kitt Peak || Spacewatch || PHO || align=right data-sort-value="0.82" | 820 m || 
|}

References

External links 
 Discovery Circumstances: Numbered Minor Planets (610001)–(615000) (IAU Minor Planet Center)

0612